= National Register of Historic Places listings in Ohio County, West Virginia =

Location of Ohio County in West Virginia

This is a list of the National Register of Historic Places listings in Ohio County, West Virginia.

This is intended to be a complete list of the properties and districts on the National Register of Historic Places in Ohio County, West Virginia. The locations of National Register properties and districts for which the latitude and longitude coordinates are included below, may be seen in an online map.

There are 55 properties and districts listed on the National Register in the county, 2 of which are National Historic Landmarks.

This National Park Service list is complete through NPS recent listings posted August 28, 2026.

Contents: Counties in West Virginia

Barbour - Berkeley - Boone - Braxton - Brooke - Cabell - Calhoun - Clay - Doddridge - Fayette - Gilmer - Grant - Greenbrier - Hampshire - Hancock - Hardy - Harrison - Jackson - Jefferson - Kanawha - Lewis - Lincoln - Logan - Marion - Marshall - Mason - McDowell - Mercer - Mineral - Mingo - Monongalia - Monroe - Morgan - Nicholas - Ohio - Pendleton - Pleasants - Pocahontas - Preston - Putnam - Raleigh - Randolph - Ritchie - Roane - Summers - Taylor - Tucker - Tyler - Upshur - Wayne - Webster - Wetzel - Wirt - Wood - Wyoming

== Current listings ==
	Name on the Register	Image	Date listed	Location	City or town	Description
1	Beagle Hotel	Beagle Hotel	February 11, 1993 (#92000863)	0.1 miles west of Valley Grove Rd. on the National Road; 40°05′19″N 80°33′50″W	Valley Grove	Destroyed
2	Carter Farm	Carter Farm	August 18, 1983 (#83003248)	Boggs Hill Rd. 40°05′10″N 80°39′26″W	Wheeling	
3	Cathedral Parish School	Cathedral Parish School	January 9, 1997 (#96001572)	Junction of 14th and Byron Sts. 40°03′59″N 80°43′10″W	Wheeling	
4	Center Wheeling Market	Center Wheeling Market	February 20, 1975 (#75001896)	Market St. between 22nd and 23rd Sts. 40°03′32″N 80°43′27″W	Wheeling	
5	Centre Market Square Historic District	Centre Market Square Historic District	January 12, 1984 (#84003651)	Roughly Market St. between 20th and 23rd Sts.; also the southern side of Main from Alley 19 to 20th St., and Chapline, Eoff and Charles Sts. bounded by Lane C, 22nd, and 24th Sts. 40°03′36″N 80°43′25″W	Wheeling	Second set of boundaries represents a boundary increase of February 25, 1987
6	Chapline Street Row Historic District	Chapline Street Row Historic District	January 12, 1984 (#84003655)	2301-2323 Chapline St. 40°03′28″N 80°43′27″W	Wheeling	
7	Crispin Center at Oglebay Park		August 31, 2026 (#100013354)	1637 Waddington Drive; 40°06′17″N 80°39′31″W	Wheeling	
8	Dimmeydale Historic District		December 4, 2025 (#100008822)	Inclusive of area encompassed by Cypress Avenue at the north, Wheeling Creek at the west, Veron Avenue at the south and the alley just east of Greenwood Avenue at the east 40°03′57″N 80°40′56″W	Wheeling	
9	East Wheeling Historic District	East Wheeling Historic District	November 22, 1999 (#99001402)	Roughly bounded by Chapline, Eoff, 18th, McColloch, 12th, and 11th Sts. 40°03′58″N 80°42′58″W	Wheeling	
10	Edemar	Edemar	May 28, 1992 (#91001728)	1330 National Road; 40°04′09″N 80°40′52″W	Wheeling	
11	Elm Grove Stone Arch Bridge	Elm Grove Stone Arch Bridge	August 21, 1981 (#81000606)	U.S. Route 40; 40°02′37″N 80°39′32″W	Wheeling	
12	Elm Hill	Elm Hill	December 4, 1991 (#91001732)	WV 88 southwest of the Wheeling Country Club; 40°05′39″N 80°40′36″W	Wheeling	
13	Feay Inn	Feay Inn	February 11, 1993 (#92000872)	9 Burkham Ct. 40°02′55″N 80°38′37″W	Wheeling	
14	Fischer-Lasch Farmhouse	Fischer-Lasch Farmhouse	July 21, 1995 (#95000875)	100 Waddles Run Rd. 40°05′15″N 80°40′43″W	Wheeling	
15	Harry C. and Jessie F. Franzheim House	Harry C. and Jessie F. Franzheim House	March 27, 1989 (#89000183)	404 S. Front St. 40°04′01″N 80°43′45″W	Wheeling	
16	L. S. Good House	L. S. Good House	November 28, 1988 (#88002667)	95 14th St. 40°03′59″N 80°43′02″W	Wheeling	
17	Robert W. Hazlett House	Robert W. Hazlett House	May 2, 1991 (#91000552)	921 N. Main St. 40°03′44″N 80°43′29″W	Wheeling	
18	Highland Park Historic District	Highland Park Historic District	April 7, 1993 (#93000222)	Highland Park, junction of Lincoln Dr. and National Road; 40°03′06″N 80°39′53″W	Wheeling	
19	La Belle Iron Works	La Belle Iron Works	November 24, 1997 (#97001415)	Junction of 31st and Wood Sts. 40°03′01″N 80°43′20″W	Wheeling	
20	Lang-Hess House	Lang-Hess House	March 22, 2006 (#06000174)	1625 Wood St. 40°03′50″N 80°42′54″W	Wheeling	
21	Henry K. List House	Henry K. List House	October 4, 1978 (#78002807)	827 Main St. 40°04′22″N 80°43′30″W	Wheeling	
22	Johnson Camden McKinley House	Johnson Camden McKinley House	August 18, 1983 (#83003251)	147 Bethany Pike; 40°05′14″N 80°41′35″W	Wheeling	
23	John McLure House	John McLure House	August 5, 1991 (#91001013)	203 S. Front St. 40°04′08″N 80°43′46″W	Wheeling	
24	Monroe Street East Historic District	Monroe Street East Historic District	February 12, 1980 (#80004036)	12th and Byron Sts. 40°04′03″N 80°43′08″W	Wheeling	
25	Mount de Chantal Visitation Academy	Mount de Chantal Visitation Academy	November 27, 1978 (#78002808)	Washington Ave. 40°04′10″N 80°41′38″W	Wheeling	Demolished in November of 2011
26	Mount Saint Joseph	Mount Saint Joseph	January 17, 2008 (#07001418)	137 Mt. Saint Joseph Rd. 40°06′49″N 80°39′30″W	Wheeling	
27	Mt. Woods Cemetery	Mt. Woods Cemetery	September 4, 2013 (#13000685)	Mt. Wood Road., N. of 4th 40°04′51″N 80°43′20″W	Wheeling	
28	National Road Corridor Historic District	National Road Corridor Historic District	February 11, 1993 (#92000874)	National Road from Bethany Pike to Park View Ln. 40°03′53″N 80°40′40″W	Wheeling	
29	National Road Mile Markers Nos. 8, 9, 10, 11, 13, 14	National Road Mile Markers Nos. 8, 9, 10, 11, 13, 14	February 11, 1993 (#92000873)	Along the National Road from Mt. Echo to Triadelphia; 40°04′27″N 80°35′38″W	Mt. Echo, Point Mills, Roney's Point, Triadelphia, Valley Camp, and Valley Grove	
30	North Wheeling Historic District	North Wheeling Historic District	December 9, 1988 (#88002693)	Roughly bounded by Main Street Terrace, Market St., Interstate 70, and N. Main St.; also roughly bounded by 6th, Main, and Market Sts., and Main St. Terrace; also inclusive of area encompassed by Northern Pkwy, Ohio R., 6th St., and bluff to the east 40°04′28″N 80°43′29″W	Wheeling	Second and third sets of boundaries represent boundary increases approved January 17, 2008 and August 29, 2022
31	H. C. Ogden House	H. C. Ogden House	July 12, 1990 (#90001067)	12 Park Rd. 40°05′15″N 80°41′43″W	Wheeling	
32	Oglebay Mansion Museum	Oglebay Mansion Museum	August 29, 1979 (#79002595)	Oglebay Park; 40°06′07″N 80°40′08″W	Wheeling	
33	Riverside Iron Works Office Building	Riverside Iron Works Office Building	March 17, 2015 (#15000096)	1507-1509 Main St. 40°03′52″N 80°43′25″W	Wheeling	
34	Charles W. Russell House	Charles W. Russell House	November 12, 1993 (#93001229)	75 12th St. 40°04′03″N 80°43′15″W	Wheeling	
35	Shaw Hall, West Liberty State College	Shaw Hall, West Liberty State College	December 27, 1996 (#96001528)	Bethany Pike, approximately 1.25 miles south of junction with Locust Grove Rd. 40°09′56″N 80°36′07″W	West Liberty	
36	Shepherd Hall	Shepherd Hall	December 18, 1970 (#70000661)	Monument Place and Kruger St. 40°02′33″N 80°39′33″W	Wheeling	
37	Shotwell Hall, West Liberty State College	Shotwell Hall, West Liberty State College	December 27, 1996 (#96001529)	Bethany Pike, approximately 1.25 miles south of junction with Locust Grove Rd. 40°09′49″N 80°36′10″W	West Liberty	
38	South Wheeling Historic District	South Wheeling Historic District	March 5, 2020 (#100003668)	Roughly bounded by WV 2 and 31st, 41st, and Chapline Sts. 40°02′52″N 80°43′30″W	Wheeling	
39	David Stewart Farm	David Stewart Farm	May 29, 1979 (#79002594)	Dallas Pike, County Route 43; 40°01′28″N 80°31′55″W	Triadelphia	
40	Stone Tavern at Roney's Point	Stone Tavern at Roney's Point	February 11, 1993 (#92000864)	Junction of E. National and Roney's Point Rds. 40°04′25″N 80°35′57″W	Roney's Point	
41	William Miles Tiernan House	William Miles Tiernan House	March 25, 1993 (#93000223)	5 Kenwood Pl. 40°04′44″N 80°41′10″W	Wheeling	
42	Virginia Apartments		November 3, 2022 (#100008380)	902 Main St. 40°04′19″N 80°43′27″W	Wheeling	
43	Warwood Fire Station	Warwood Fire Station	May 2, 1996 (#96000440)	1609 Warwood Ave. 40°07′04″N 80°41′56″W	Wheeling	
44	Warwood Historic District		May 7, 2025 (#100011807)	N 23rd Street to the North, Ohio River to the west Warwood Avenue & River Road to the east and Centre Foundry to the south 40°07′12″N 80°42′05″W	Wheeling	
45	West Liberty Presbyterian Church	West Liberty Presbyterian Church	July 3, 1980 (#80004407)	Main St. 40°10′07″N 80°35′36″W	West Liberty	
46	West Virginia Independence Hall	West Virginia Independence Hall	January 26, 1970 (#70000660)	1524 Market St. 40°03′51″N 80°43′46″W	Wheeling	
47	Wheeling Baltimore and Ohio Railroad Passenger Station	Wheeling Baltimore and Ohio Railroad Passenger Station	March 26, 1979 (#79002596)	College Sq. 40°03′48″N 80°43′18″W	Wheeling	
48	Wheeling Country Club	Wheeling Country Club	April 26, 1990 (#90000711)	355 Oglebay Dr. 40°05′28″N 80°40′56″W	Wheeling	
49	Wheeling Historic District	Wheeling Historic District	December 31, 1979 (#79002597)	Roughly bounded by railroad tracks, Eoff, Water, and 10th Sts. 40°04′02″N 80°43′14″W	Wheeling	
50	Wheeling Island Historic District	Wheeling Island Historic District	April 2, 1992 (#92000320)	Roughly bounded by Stone, Front, North, Ontario, Erie, and Wabash Sts. 40°04′17″N 80°43′57″W	Wheeling	Extends into Belmont County, Ohio
51	Wheeling Suspension Bridge	Wheeling Suspension Bridge	January 26, 1970 (#70000662)	Over the Ohio River from 10th St. in Wheeling to Virginia St. on Wheeling Island; 40°04′13″N 80°43′38″W	Wheeling	
52	Wheeling Warehouse Historic District	Wheeling Warehouse Historic District	December 16, 2002 (#02001530)	Roughly along Main St., Water St., 21st St., 22nd St., South St., 18th St., Eoff St. and Chapline St.; also roughly bounded by Main, 20th, and east side of Market Sts., and Wheeling Cr. 40°03′39″N 80°43′22″W	Wheeling	Second set of addresses represent a boundary increase approved April 14, 2022.
53	Woodridge	Woodridge	July 6, 2005 (#05000658)	1308 Steenrod Ave. 40°04′08″N 80°41′12″W	Wheeling	
54	Robert C. Woods House	Robert C. Woods House	May 2, 1991 (#91000551)	923 N. Main St. 40°04′16″N 80°43′29″W	Wheeling	
55	Woodsdale-Edgewood Neighborhood Historic District	Woodsdale-Edgewood Neighborhood Historic District	March 21, 1997 (#96000445)	Roughly bounded by Orchard Rd., Edgwood St., Carmel Rd., Bae-Mar, and Lenox to Wheeling Creek, and Pine St. to Park St. 40°04′35″N 80°40′58″W	Wheeling	

== See also ==
- List of National Historic Landmarks in West Virginia
- National Register of Historic Places listings in West Virginia
