= Hess House =

Hess House may refer to:

- Binks Hess House and Barn, Marcella, Arkansas
- Thomas E. Hess House, Marcella, Arkansas
- Thomas M. Hess House, Marcella, Arkansas
- Philip Hess House, Jefferson City, Missouri
- Christian Hess House and Shoemaker's Shop, Schoharie, New York
- Elmer Hess House, Wyoming, Ohio
- George Hess House and Shop, a contributing building to the Aaronsburg Historic District, Aaronsburg, Pennsylvania
- Livingston-Hess House, San Antonio, Texas listed on the National Register of Historic Places
- Christian Hess House, a contributing building to the North Wheeling Historic District, Wheeling, West Virginia
- Lang-Hess House, Wheeling, West Virginia

== See also ==
- The Hess Homestead
