= Fischer House =

Fischer House may refer to:

in the United States (by state)

- Joseph Fischer House, Benicia, California, listed on the National Register of Historic Places (NRHP) in Solano County, California
- House at 7227 San Pedro, Jacksonville, Florida, also known as the Fischer House, NRHP-listed
- Dr. Luther C. and Lucy Hurt Fischer House, Atlanta, Georgia, listed on the NRHP in DeKalb County, Georgia
- Charles M. Fleshman and Emma M. Fischer House, Hawarden, Iowa, NRHP-listed, in Sioux County
- Fischer House (Lake Providence, Louisiana), listed on the NRHP in East Carroll Parish, Louisiana
- John and Edna Truesdell Fischer Farmstead, Sheldon, Michigan, NRHP-listed
- Fischer House (Austin, Texas), NRHP-listed
- Fischer-Lasch Farmhouse, Wheeling, West Virginia, listed on the NRHP in Ohio County, West Virginia

== See also ==
- Fisher House (disambiguation)
