= Frederick F. Faris =

American architect

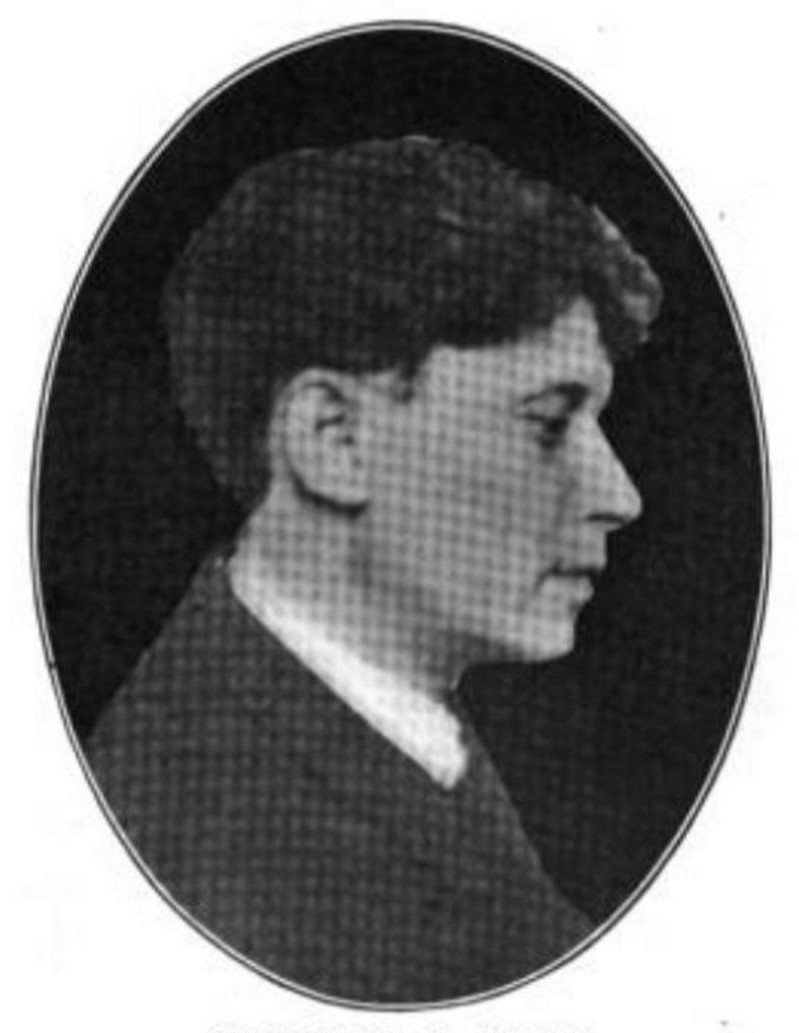
- Frederick F. Faris, circa 1905
- Born: August 1, 1870; St. Clairsville, Ohio
- Died: June 20, 1927 (aged 56); Wheeling, West Virginia
- Occupation: Architect
- Buildings: Shotwell Hall, West Liberty State College, West Liberty, West Virginia

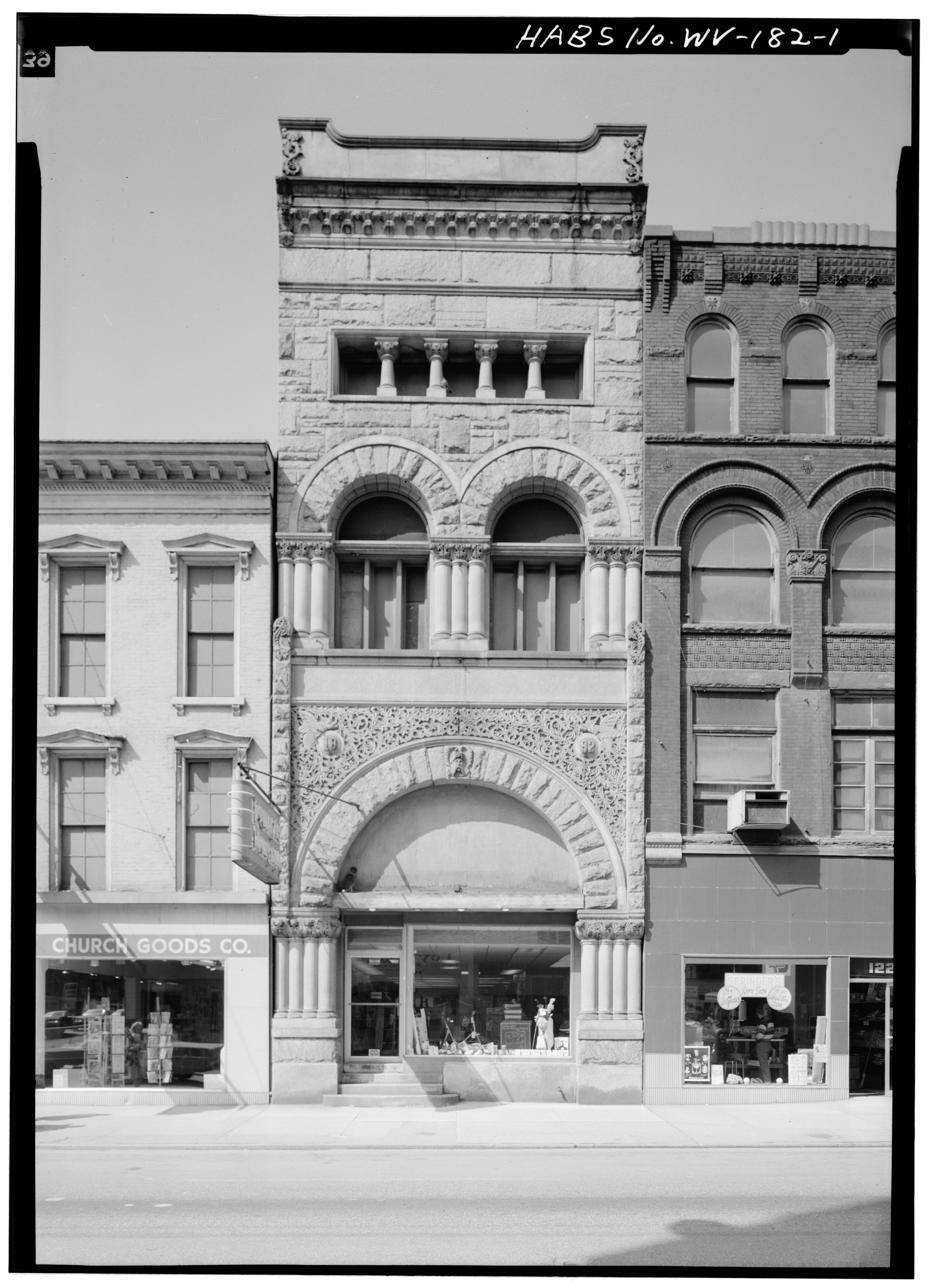
The Bank of Wheeling Building, designed by Leiner & Faris and built in 1892.

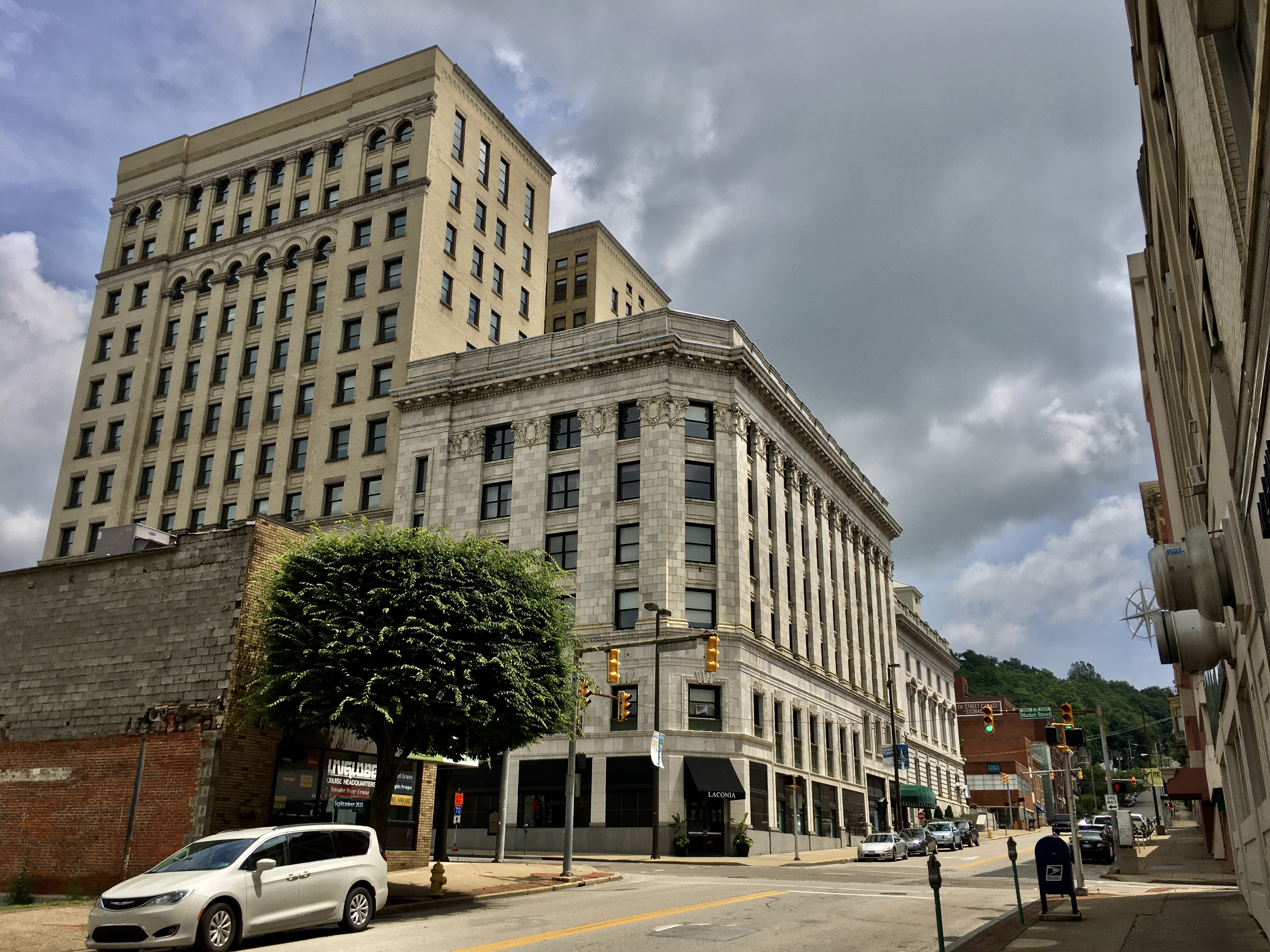
The Schmulbach Building (left), designed by Giesey & Faris and completed in 1907, and the Laconia Building (center), designed by Faris alone in 1911.

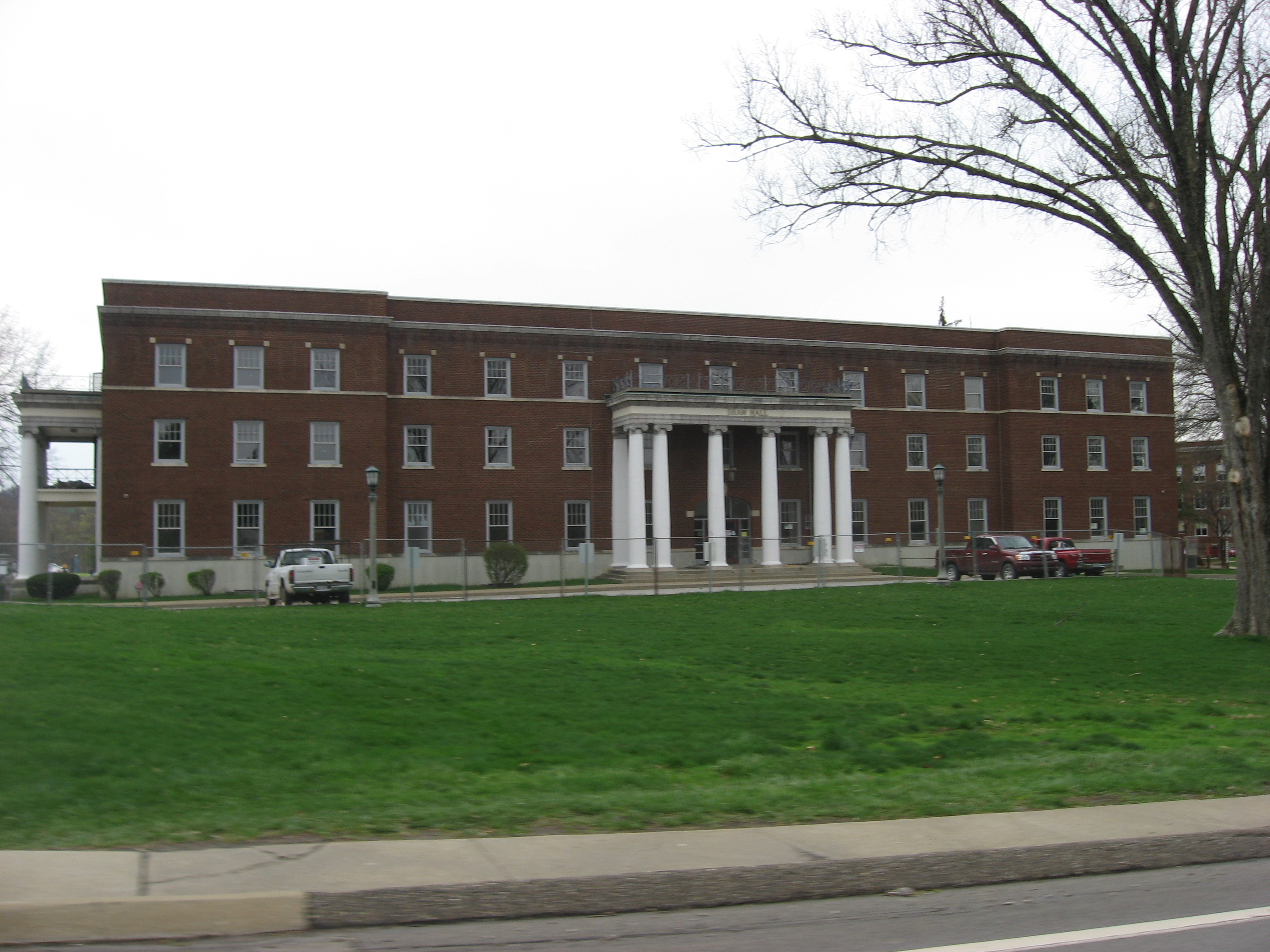
Shaw Hall at West Liberty University, completed in 1920.

Frederick F. Faris (1870–1927) was a Wheeling, West Virginia-based architect.

== Life and career ==
Frederick Fisher Faris was born August 1, 1870, in St. Clairsville, Ohio to Joseph Anderson Faris, an artist, and Mary Elizabeth (Pratt) Faris. The family moved east to Wheeling when he was two years old. He was educated in the public schools, and after finishing high school joined the office of Edgar W. Wells, architect for Klieves, Kraft & Company, as a student. He later worked for architects in Chicago and New York City before returning to Wheeling in 1892. That year he formed a partnership with Joseph Leiner, known as Leiner & Faris. This was dissolved in 1894 when Faris joined Edward B. Franzheim and Millard F. Giesey to form Franzheim, Giesey & Faris. Franzheim withdrew in 1899, but the firm continued as Giesey & Faris until 1911. Faris then worked in private practice until his death sixteen years later. In 1924 Faris was joined by his nephew, Frederic Faris, who succeeded to the practice at his death. The younger Faris practiced until own his sudden death in 1964.

He designed a variety of residential, commercial, and educational buildings. Among the buildings he designed were the Schmulbach Building, the tallest building in Wheeling, and the Market Auditorium, then the longest building. Other notable buildings include the Wheeling Electric Company, the First National Bank of West Virginia, the Wheeling Intelligencer, the former public library, the Scottish Rite Cathedral, and numerous schools including the Triadelphia Junior High School and Madison School. He also designed Mount Carmel Monastery (1917).

Faris served one term in the West Virginia House of Delegates in 1913.

== Personal life and death ==
Faris was married in 1897 to Nellie Egerter. They had no children. Faris died June 20, 1927, from strep throat at the age of 56. He was buried at Greenwood Cemetery in Wheeling.

== Legacy ==
At the time of his death he was known as the "dean of Wheeling architects." Several of his works have been listed on the United States National Register of Historic Places, and others contribute to listed historic districts.

== Selected works ==
Buildings built between 1892 and 1894 are attributed to Leiner & Faris, between 1894 and 1899 to Franzheim, Giesey & Faris, between 1899 and 1911 to Giesey & Faris, between 1911 and 1927 to Frederick F. Faris and after 1927 to Frederic Faris.

- Bank of Wheeling Building, (Note: Formerly a contributing property to the Wheeling Historic District, NRHP–listed in 1979.) 1229 Main St, Wheeling, West Virginia (1892, demolished)
- Vance Memorial Presbyterian Church, (Note: A contributing property to the National Road Corridor Historic District, NRHP–listed in 1992.) 905 National Rd, Wheeling, West Virginia (1896–97)
- First United Methodist Church, (Note: A contributing property to the Mannington Historic District, NRHP–listed in 1995.) 118 Clarksburg St, Mannington, West Virginia (1898)
- George M. Snook house, (Note: Formerly a contributing property to the National Road Corridor Historic District, NRHP–listed in 1992.) 1315 National Rd, Wheeling, West Virginia (1898, demolished)
- Mannington Public School, 113 Clarksburg St, Mannington, West Virginia (1902)
- Schmulbach Building, (Note: A contributing property to the Wheeling Historic District, NRHP–listed in 1979.) 1134 Market St, Wheeling, West Virginia (1904–07)
- Wheeling Country Club (former), (Note: A contributing property to the Wheeling Country Club historic district, NRHP–listed in 1990.) 100 Kensington Dr, Wheeling, West Virginia (1905)
- Harry Paull house, 1312 Pleasant Ave, Wellsburg, West Virginia (1907–11, NRHP 1986)
- St. John's United Church of Christ (former), (Note: A contributing property to the Centre Market Square Historic District, NRHP–listed in 1984 and amended in 1987.) 41 22nd St, Wheeling, West Virginia (1907–08)
- Sumner Jones house, (Note: A contributing property to the Woodsdale–Edgewood Neighborhood Historic District, NRHP–listed in 1997.) 8 Kenwood Pl, Wheeling, West Virginia (1908)
- George Rentsch house, 228 Carmel Rd, Wheeling, West Virginia (1910)
- YMCA Building, 32 20th St, Wheeling, West Virginia (1910)
- Laconia Building, 1144 Market St, Wheeling, West Virginia (1911)
- YWCA Building, (Note: Designed in association with Edward B. Franzheim. A contributing property to the East Wheeling Historic District, NRHP–listed in 1999.) 1100 Chapline St, Wheeling, West Virginia (1913–15)
- Mount Carmel Monastery, 102 Carmel Rd, Wheeling, West Virginia (1915–17)
- Wagner Building, (Note: A contributing property to the Wheeling Warehouse Historic District, NRHP–listed in 2002.) 2001 Main St, Wheeling, West Virginia (1915)
- Madison School, (Note: A contributing property to the Wheeling Island Historic District, NRHP–listed in 1992.) 91 Zane St, Wheeling, West Virginia (1916)
- Scottish Rite Cathedral, 83 14th St, Wheeling, West Virginia (1916)
- Triadelphia High School (former), 1636 National Rd, Wheeling, West Virginia (1917–19)
- Shaw Hall, West Liberty University, West Liberty, West Virginia (1919–20, NRHP 1996)
- Shotwell Hall, West Liberty University, West Liberty, West Virginia (1936–37, NRHP 1996)
- City–County Building, 1500 Chapline St, Wheeling, West Virginia (1960)
