= Harry and Louisiana Beall Paull Mansion =

Historic house in West Virginia, United States

- U.S. National Register of Historic Places
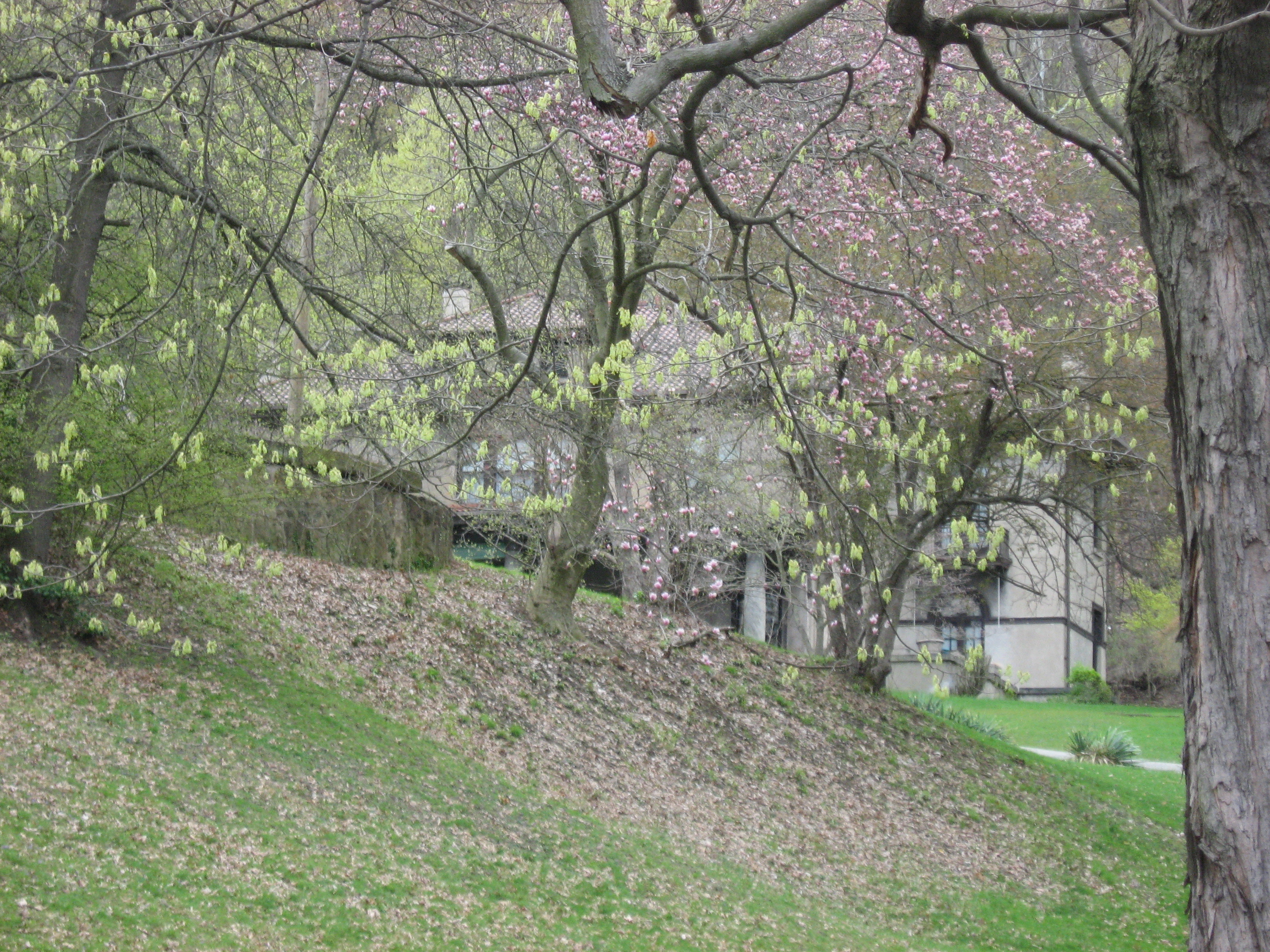

- Location within West Virginia Location within the United States
- Location: 1312 Pleasant Ave., Wellsburg, West Virginia
- Coordinates: 40°16′29″N 80°36′23″W
- Area: 5.1 acres (2.1 ha)
- Built: 1907
- Architect: Gresey & Faris
- Architectural style: Late 19th And 20th Century Revivals, Mediterranean Style
- MPS: Pleasant Avenue MRA
- NRHP reference No.: 86001075
- Added to NRHP: May 16, 1986

Harry and Louisiana Beall Paull Mansion, also known as "Morningside" and the Charles H. and Geraldine Beall House, is a historic home located at Wellsburg, Brooke County, West Virginia. It was built in 1907–1911, and is a stuccoed dwelling in the Mediterranean Revival style with Spanish Colonial Revival style elements. It features a five bay portico with a hipped roof and eight columns. It also has wrought iron porches and pan tile roofs. It was designed by noted Wheeling architect Frederick F. Faris (1870–1927).

It was listed on the National Register of Historic Places in 1986.
