= Riverside Iron Works Office Building =

- U.S. National Register of Historic Places
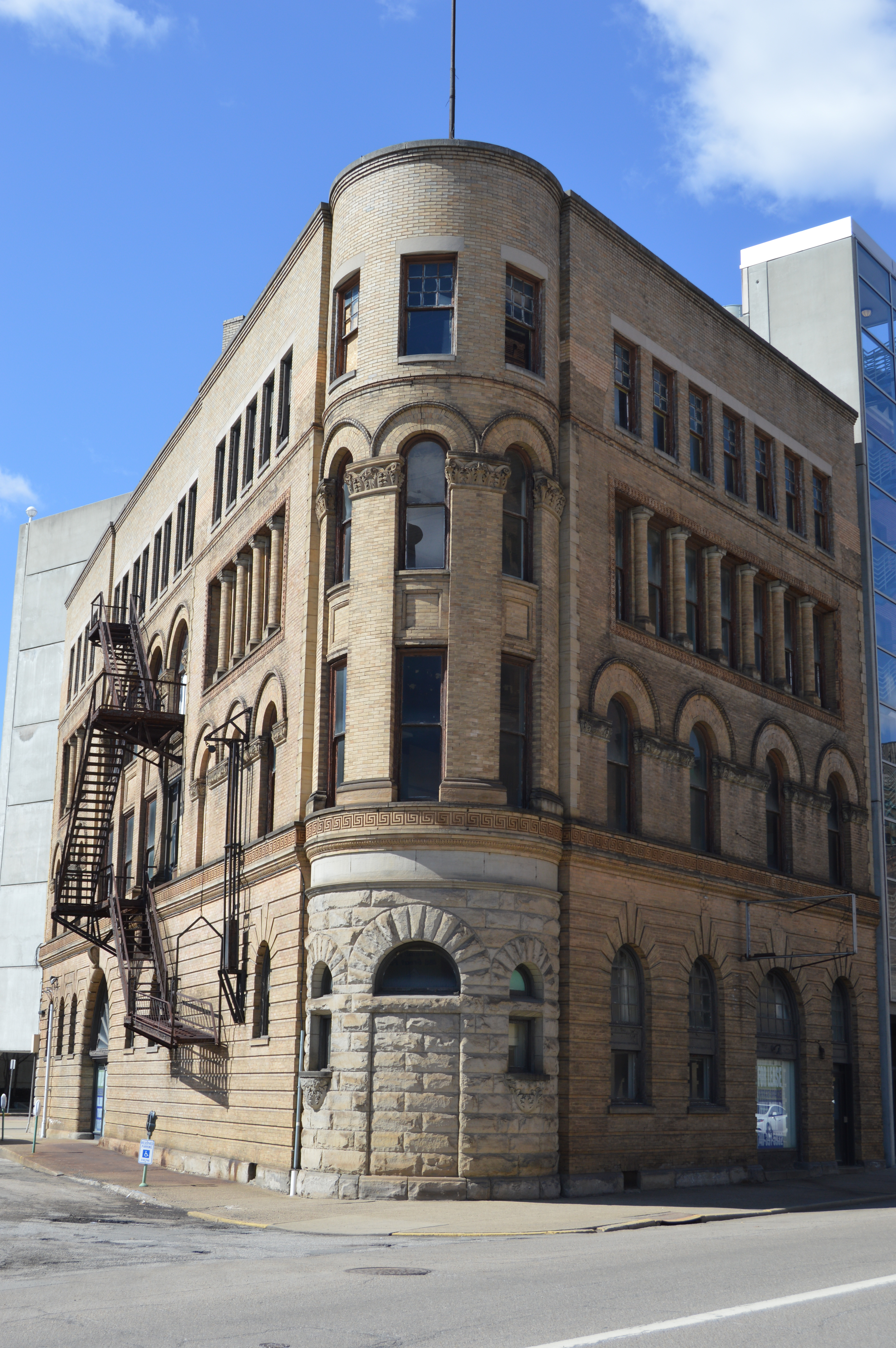

- Location within West Virginia Location within the United States
- Location: 1507-09 Main St., Wheeling, West Virginia
- Coordinates: 40°3′52″N 80°43′25″W
- Built: 1896
- NRHP reference No.: 15000096
- Added to NRHP: March 17, 2015

The Riverside Iron Works Office Building is a historic commercial building at 1507–09 Main Street in Wheeling, West Virginia. It is a four-story masonry structure, triangular in shape, and built out of light-colored brick with stone trim elements. The first three floors, built in 1896, are Richardsonian Romanesque in style, with rusticated stone elements on the ground floor at the rounded corner, and round-arch settings for doors and windows. The fourth floor, simpler in style, was added about 1907. It was built for the Riverside Iron Works, Wheeling's leading steel manufacturers at the time, and served as its headquarters until 1898, when the company was acquired by National Tube Company. In form, it is a flatiron building.

The building was listed on the National Register of Historic Places for Ohio County in 2015.

== See also ==
- National Register of Historic Places listings in Ohio County, West Virginia
- Thomas J. Bray
