= Henry K. List House =

Historic house in West Virginia, United States

- U.S. National Register of Historic Places
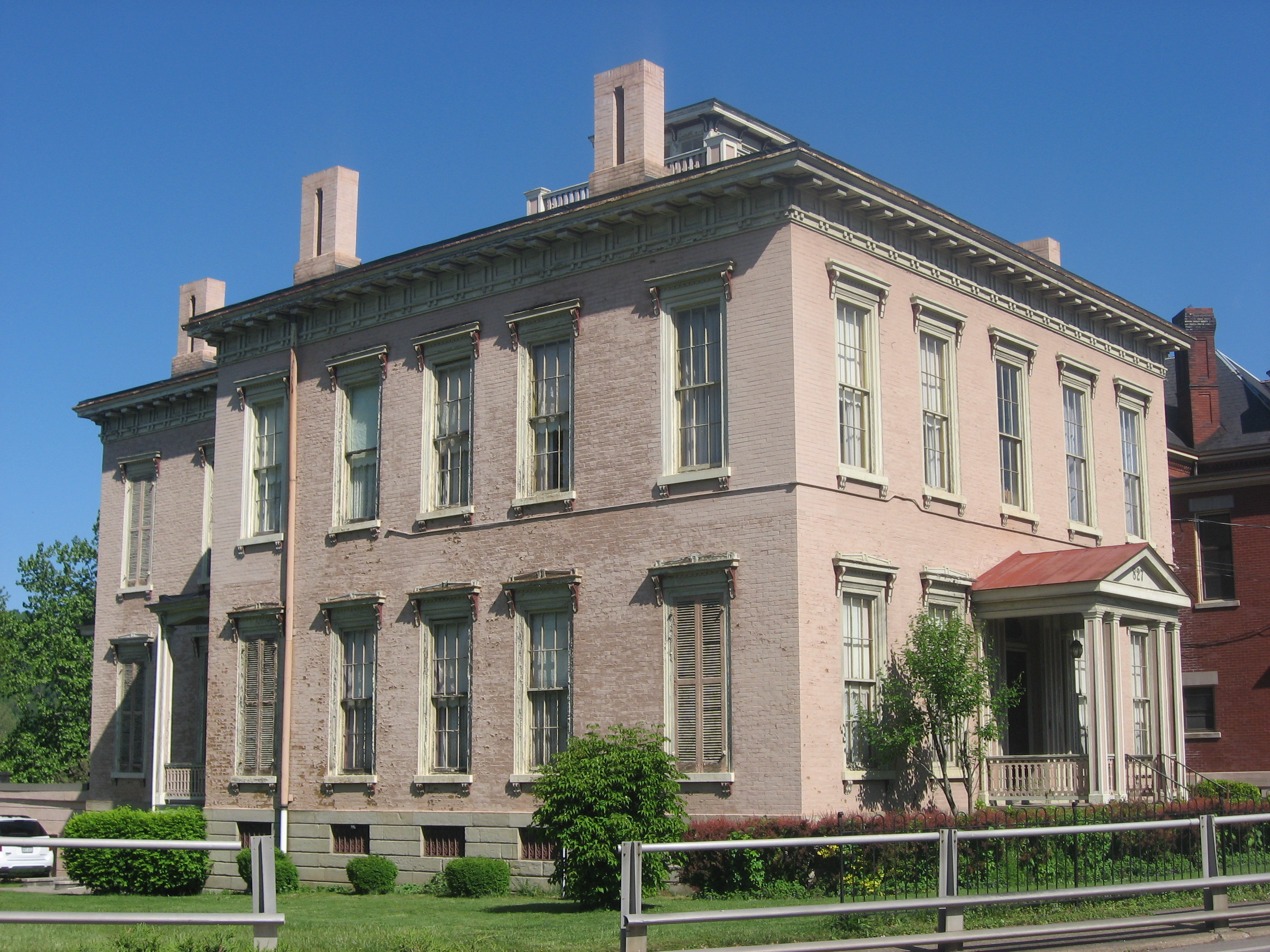
- Front and southern side

- Location within West Virginia Location within the United States
- Location: 827 Main St., Wheeling, West Virginia, United States
- Coordinates: 40°4′23″N 80°43′30″W
- Area: 0.5 acres (0.20 ha)
- Built: 1858
- Architectural style: Renaissance, Italianate
- NRHP reference No.: 78002807
- Added to NRHP: October 4, 1978

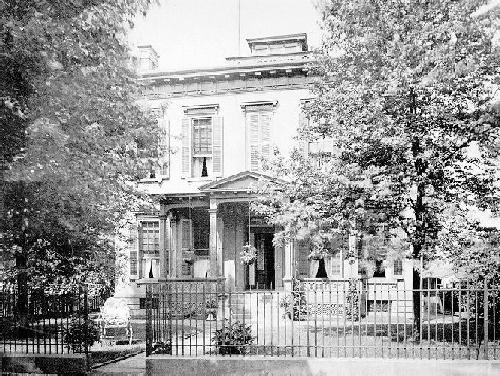
The house in 1889

The Henry K. List House, also known as the Wheeling-Moundsville Chapter of the American Red Cross, is a historic home located at 827 Main Street in Wheeling, Ohio County, West Virginia. It was built in 1858, and consists of a two-story square main block with an offset two-story rear wing. The brick mansion features a low-pitched hipped roof with a balustraded square cupola. It has Renaissance Revival and Italianate design details. The building was once occupied by the Ohio Valley Red Cross.

It was listed on the National Register of Historic Places in 1978.

== See also ==
- List of historic sites in Ohio County, West Virginia
- List of Registered Historic Places in West Virginia
- Sonnencroft
