= Thomas J. Bray =

American steel company president (1867–1933)

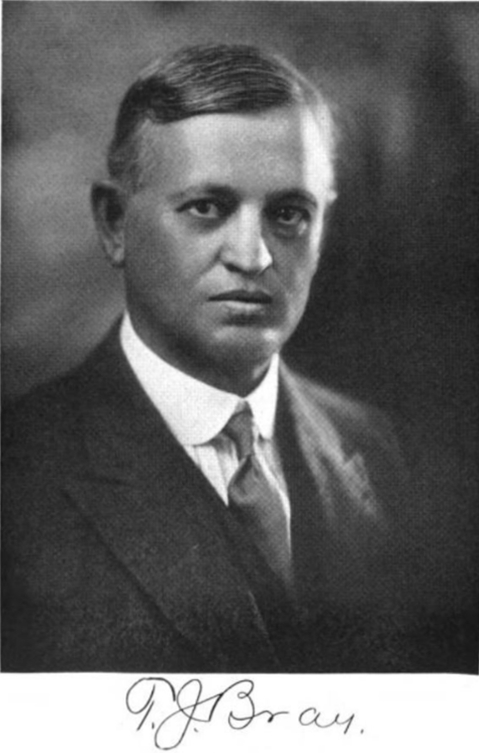
Thomas J. Bray

Thomas Joseph Bray (May 1, 1867 − December 11, 1933) was an American engineer, inventor and corporate leader of the iron and steel industry, becoming president of the third largest steel company in the US – Republic Iron and Steel Company. He was a leading member of Youngstown society and lived in its historic Crandall Park where he prospered, raised a family and led a project to develop transport on the rivers of the area. He was an industrial leader of the Mahoning River steel industry.

== Early life and education ==
He was born on May 1, 1867, in Pittsburgh, the son of Thomas Joseph Bray from Wales and Anna Jacove née Collins. His father was a mechanical engineer who had moved to America in 1853, became a manager of the National Tube Company, and was a founder of William and Mary College. He built tube steel plants for National Tube, including the Riverside Iron Works in Wheeling, West Virginia, in the continental United States. His mother was of pioneering stock, dating back to 1750, and her grandfather was the Kentucky frontiersman, Sylvester Pattie.

Bray was educated in Pittsburgh, and began work at age 16 as a pattern-making apprentice for the Lewis Foundry and Machine Company, eventually becoming chief draughtsman. In 1890 he went back to school, acquiring a mechanical engineering degree from Lehigh University.

== Career ==
After graduating in 1894, he worked for the Ohio Steel Company, McGill and Company, and United Engineering and Foundry Company, where he was chief engineer from 1901 to 1906. He joined the Republic Iron and Steel Company in 1906, became vice president of operations in 1907, and became its president in April 1911. He kept that post until April 1928, when he became a director of the Youngstown Sheet and Tube Company.

He built the first byproduct Coke plant in the east at Youngstown.

He was an inventor and received a number of patents. Bray was the inventor of a patented process for welding steel tubes together, which bears his name. The address and invention are viewed as a milestone in water distribution. This innovative process was the beginning of the steel tube industry.

In 1919, Bray announced that Republic Steel was in solidarity with two other steel companies, supporting the "open shop", which was a move hostile to union organization and resisting the proposed Steel strike of 1919 by the American Federation of Labor.

He was on the Board of Directors of the First National Bank and the Dollar Savings & Trust Company, companies in Youngstown, Ohio.

== Personal life ==
He married Isabel Matthews in 1896, and they had three children: Thomas Joseph Bray, Theodore Matthews Bray and Charles William Bray. They lived in Youngstown at 1508–1510 Fifth Avenue in the grand house of Oak Manor which had been built in 1905 as the first house of the Crandall Park development – high quality mansions for Youngstown's rich elite which are now recognised as a historic district. Their church was the First Unitarian Church of Youngstown.

He was a member of several clubs and societies including the Duquesne and University clubs in Pittsburgh; the Youngstown Country Club; the American Society of Mechanical Engineers; the American Iron and Steel Institute and the British Iron and Steel Institute.

== Death and legacy ==
He died suddenly at his office on December 11, 1933 (aged 66) in Youngstown while making plans for a trip to Washington the following day. This was to have been for Congressional hearings about a project to canalize the local rivers – Beaver, Mahoning and Shenango – so that iron ore could be shipped in cheaply as the local deposits were now exhausted. Bray had been leading this project for four years and work continued after his death, with H.R. 6732 authorizing work by the United States Army Corps of Engineers.

He and his wife are interred at Liberty Township, Trumbull County, Ohio in the Belmont Park Cemetery (sometimes called "Belmont Cemetery"). He had been president of the Beaver, Mahoning and Shenango River Improvement Association.

Going back to an 1888 address, Bray – at the time he was superintendent of the Riverside Ironworks in Wheeling, West Virginia (which became the Riverside works of the National Tube Company, – was seen as a leading industrial expert and pioneer in the production of steel pipe. This left a mark on public waterworks and distribution systems in the United States.

== See also ==
- Riverside Iron Works Office Building
