= William Miles Tiernan House =

Historic house in West Virginia, United States

- U.S. National Register of Historic Places
- U.S. Historic district – Contributing property
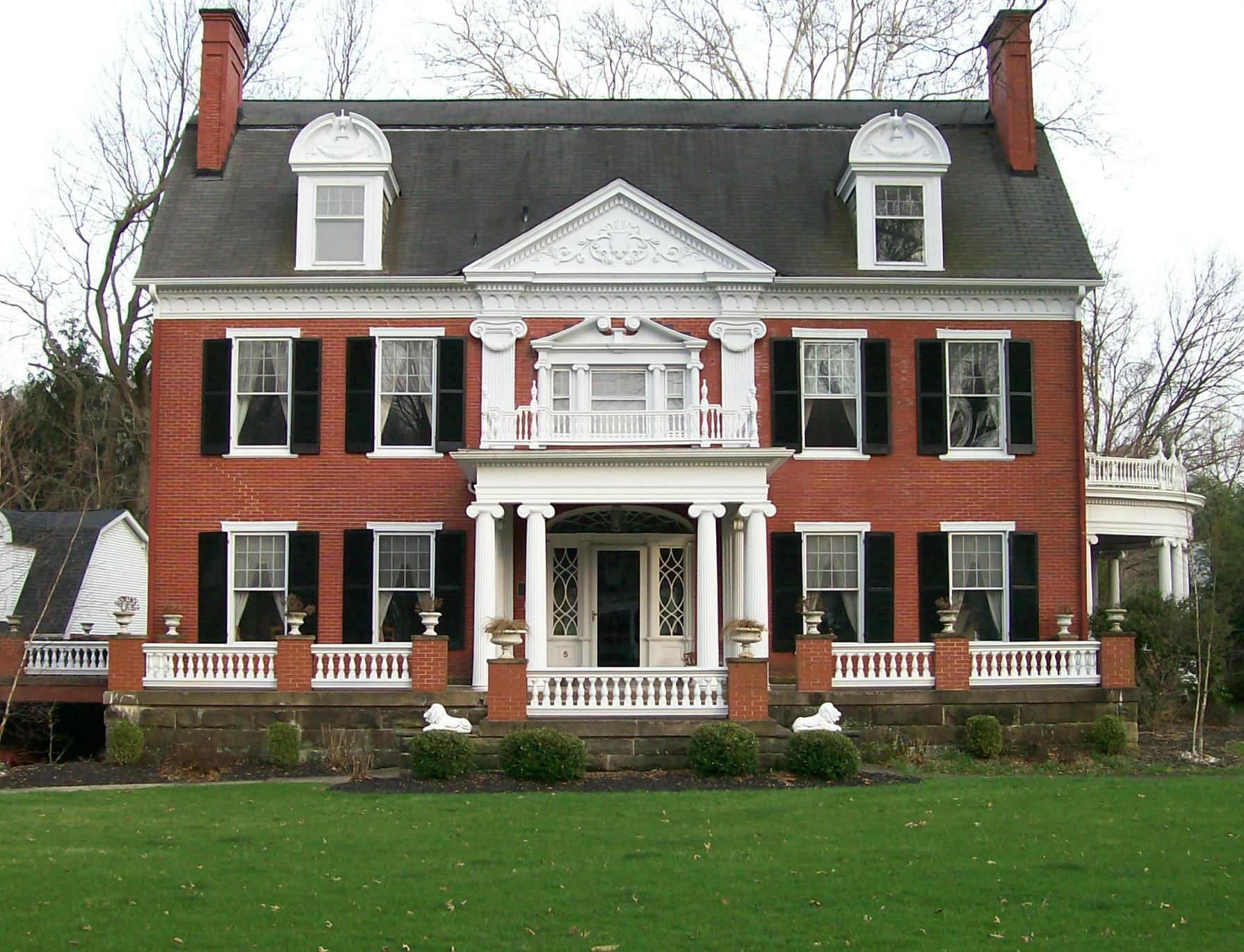
- The Tiernan House in 2010.

- Location within West Virginia Location within the United States
- Location: 5 Kenwood Pl., Wheeling, West Virginia
- Coordinates: 40°4′44″N 80°41′10″W
- Area: 0.9 acres (0.36 ha)
- Built: 1901
- Architectural style: Late 19th And 20th Century Revivals, Georgian Revival
- NRHP reference No.: 93000223
- Added to NRHP: March 25, 1993

The William Miles Tiernan House, also known as the Tiernan-Riley House, is a historic home located at Wheeling, Ohio County, West Virginia. It was built in 1900–01, and is a 2 1/2-story, L-shaped, Georgian Revival-style brick dwelling. It features two-story Ionic order pilasters that flank the one-story entrance portico. The house was built for William M. Tiernan, who was vice-president of the Bloch Brothers Tobacco Company.

It was listed on the National Register of Historic Places in 1993. It is located in the Woodsdale-Edgewood Neighborhood Historic District.

== Gallery ==
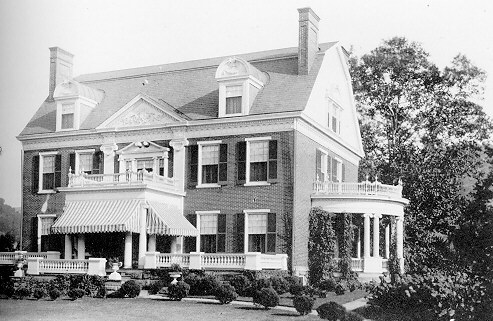
William M. Tiernan House (1904)

== See also ==
- List of historic sites in Ohio County, West Virginia
- List of Registered Historic Places in West Virginia
