= Woodsdale–Edgwood Neighborhood Historic District =

Historic district in West Virginia, United States

- U.S. National Register of Historic Places
- U.S. Historic district
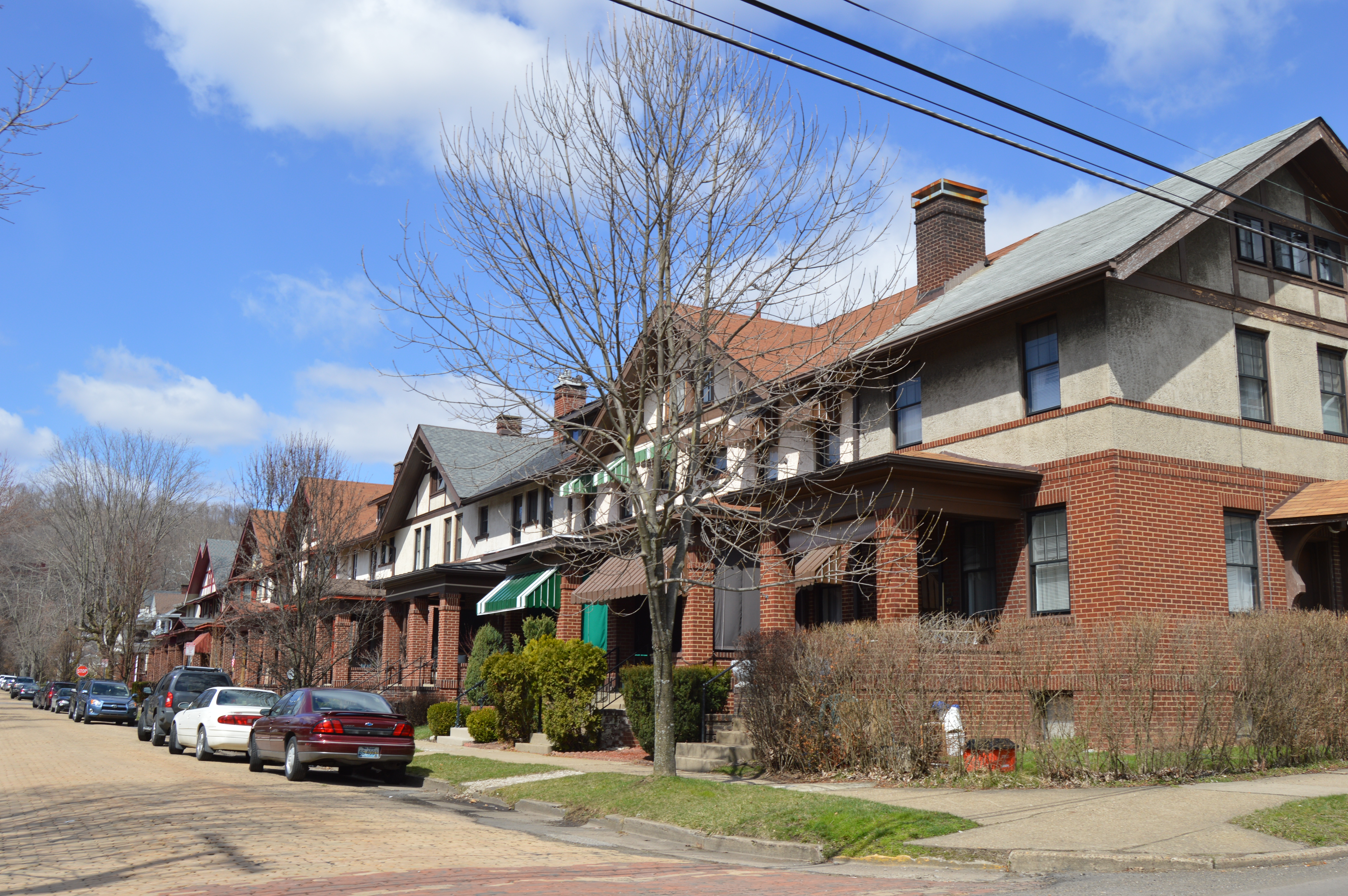
- Houses on Birch Avenue

- Location within West Virginia Location within the United States
- Location: Roughly bounded by Orchard Rd., Edgwood St., Carmel Rd., Bae--Mar and Lenox to Wheeling Cr., and Pine St. to Park St., Wheeling, West Virginia
- Coordinates: 40°4′35″N 80°40′58″W
- Area: 20 acres (8.1 ha)
- Architect: Franzheim, Edward; Faris, Fredrick, et al.
- Architectural style: Late 19th And Early 20th Century American Movements, Late 19th And 20th Century Revivals, Late Victorian
- NRHP reference No.: 96000445
- Added to NRHP: March 21, 1997

Woodsdale–Edgwood Neighborhood Historic District is a national historic district located at Wheeling, Ohio County, West Virginia. The district encompasses 969 contributing buildings and is primarily residential, developed between 1888 and 1945. A number of popular architectural styles are represented including Shingle Style, Queen Anne, Tudor Revival, American Foursquare, Colonial Revival and Bungalow style. The district also includes four Lustron houses. Notable non-residential buildings include the Edgwood Christian Mission Alliance Church (1932), St. John's Episcopal Chapel (1913), Mount Carmel Monastery (1915) designed by Frederick F. Faris (1870-1927), and Good Shepherd Home (1912). Also located in the district are the separately listed H. C. Ogden House and William Miles Tiernan House.

It was listed on the National Register of Historic Places in 1997.
