= Shotwell Hall, West Liberty State College =

- U.S. National Register of Historic Places
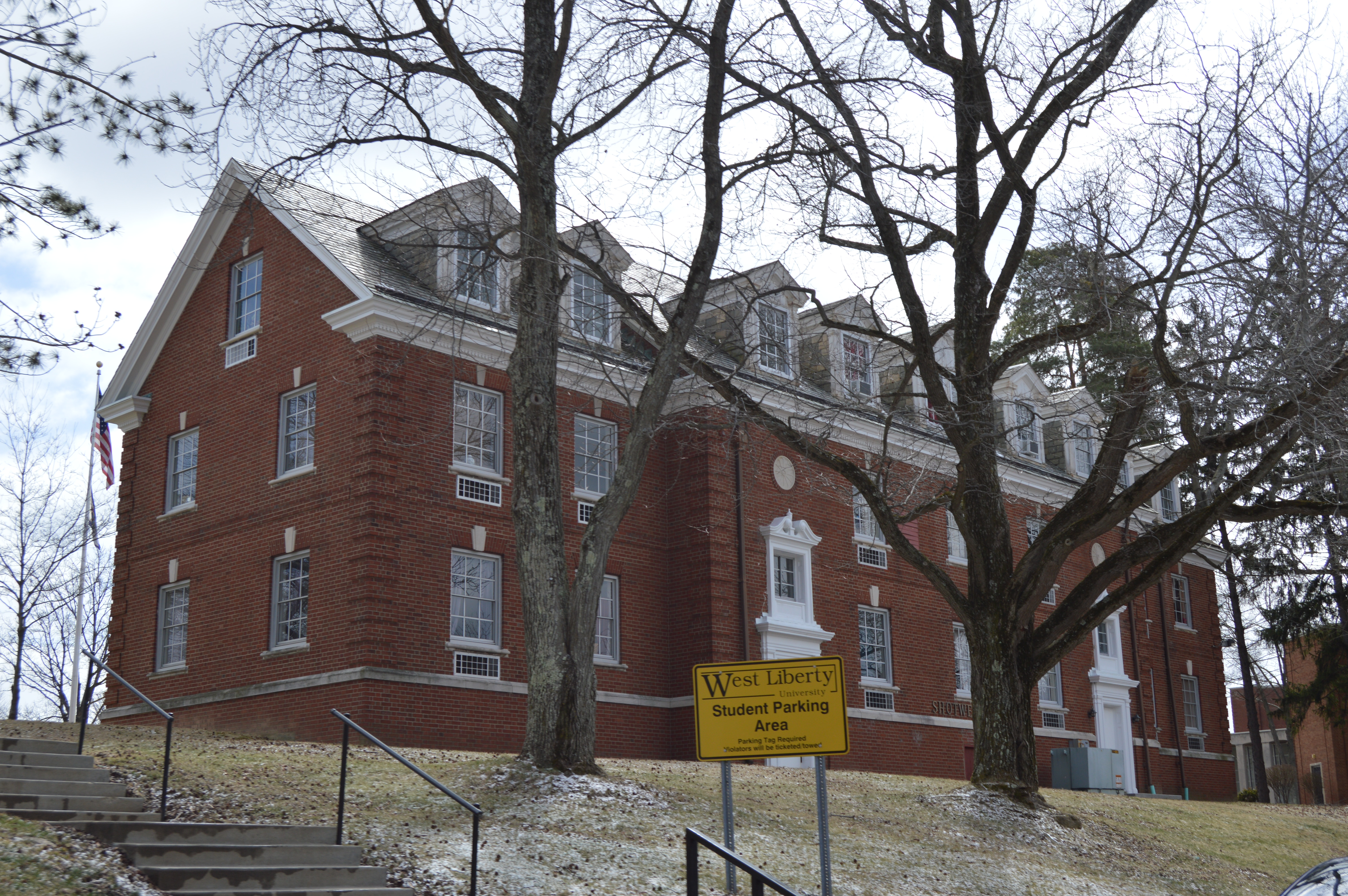
- Front and northern end

- Location within West Virginia Location within the United States
- Location: Bethany Pike, approximately 1.25 mi. S of jct. with Locust Grove Rd., West Liberty, West Virginia
- Coordinates: 40°09′49″N 80°36′10″W
- Area: less than one acre
- Built: 1937
- Architect: Faris, Frederick F.
- Architectural style: Colonial Revival
- NRHP reference No.: 96001529
- Added to NRHP: December 27, 1996

Shotwell Hall, also known as Fraternity Hall, is a historic dormitory located on the campus of West Liberty University at West Liberty, Ohio County, West Virginia. It was designed by noted Wheeling architect Frederick F. Faris (1870–1927) and built as a Public Works Administration project in 1937. It is a 2 1/2-story red brick over concrete block building in the Colonial Revival style. It features a broken pediment doorway and pedimented gable ends. The building was built as a men's dormitory, but now houses faculty offices. The building is named for Nathan Shotwell, first president of West Liberty Academy from 1838 to 1854.

It was listed on the National Register of Historic Places in 1996.

== See also ==
- University and college buildings listed on the National Register of Historic Places
