= West Liberty Presbyterian Church =

Historic church in West Virginia, United States

- U.S. National Register of Historic Places
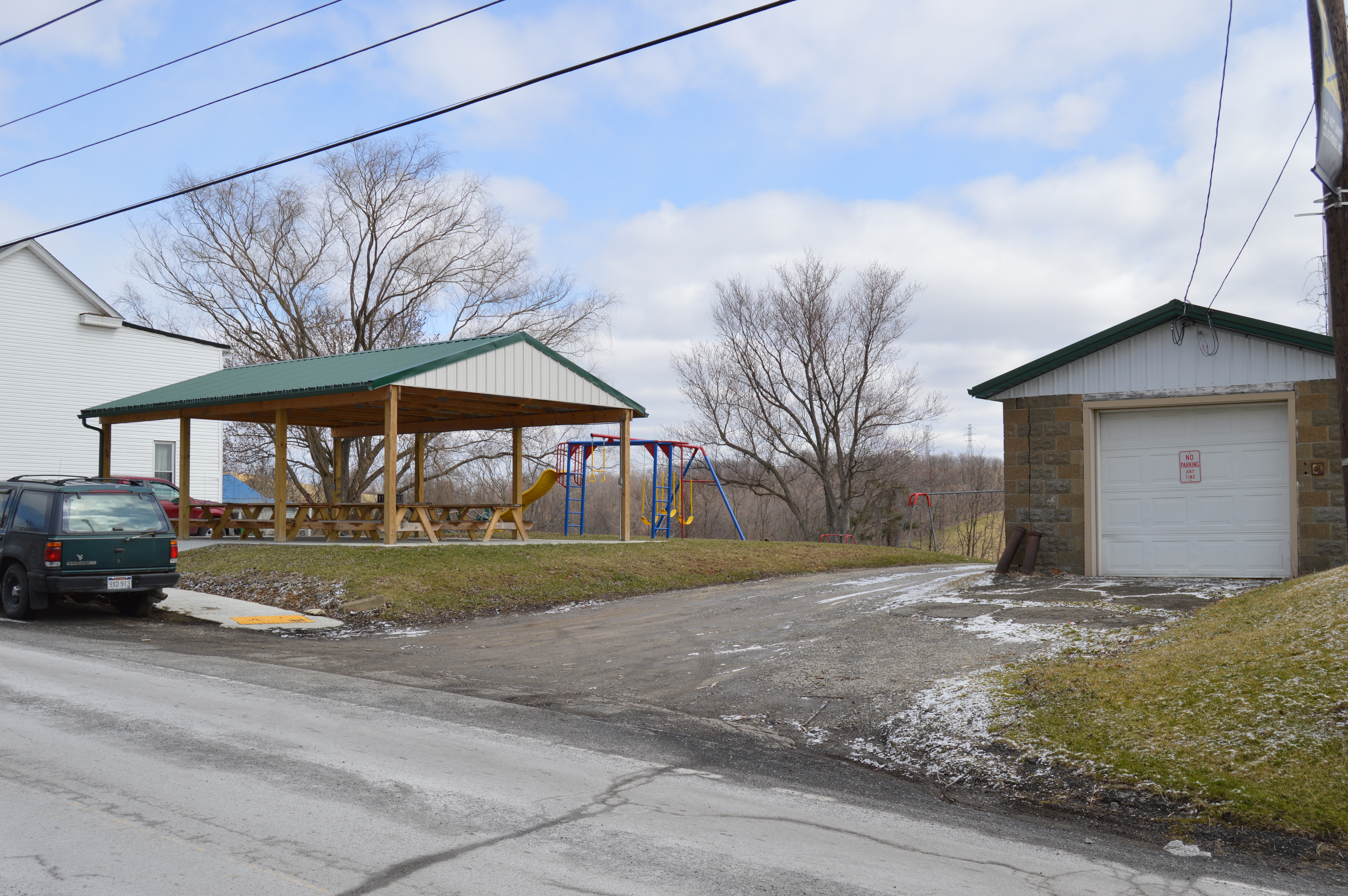
- Site where the church was once located

- Location within West Virginia Location within the United States
- Location: Main Street, West Liberty, West Virginia
- Coordinates: 40°10′7″N 80°35′36″W
- Area: 0.3 acres (0.12 ha)
- Built: 1873
- Architect: Stanton M. Howard
- Architectural style: Gothic
- NRHP reference No.: 80004407
- Added to NRHP: July 3, 1980

West Liberty Presbyterian Church, also known as West Liberty Federated Church, was a historic Presbyterian church located at West Liberty, Ohio County, West Virginia, US. It was built in 1873 to a design by Wheeling architect Stanton M. Howard. It was a simple rectangle in form with a projecting vestibule, in the Late Victorian Gothic style. It was constructed of brick and stone, with steeply pitched roofs, parapet gables, and an open belfry. The church was active in founding West Liberty Academy in 1838, which is now West Liberty University.

It was listed on the National Register of Historic Places in 1980. It has since been demolished, and the site redeveloped as a small park.
