= H. C. Ogden House =

Historic house in West Virginia, United States

- U.S. National Register of Historic Places
- U.S. Historic district – Contributing property
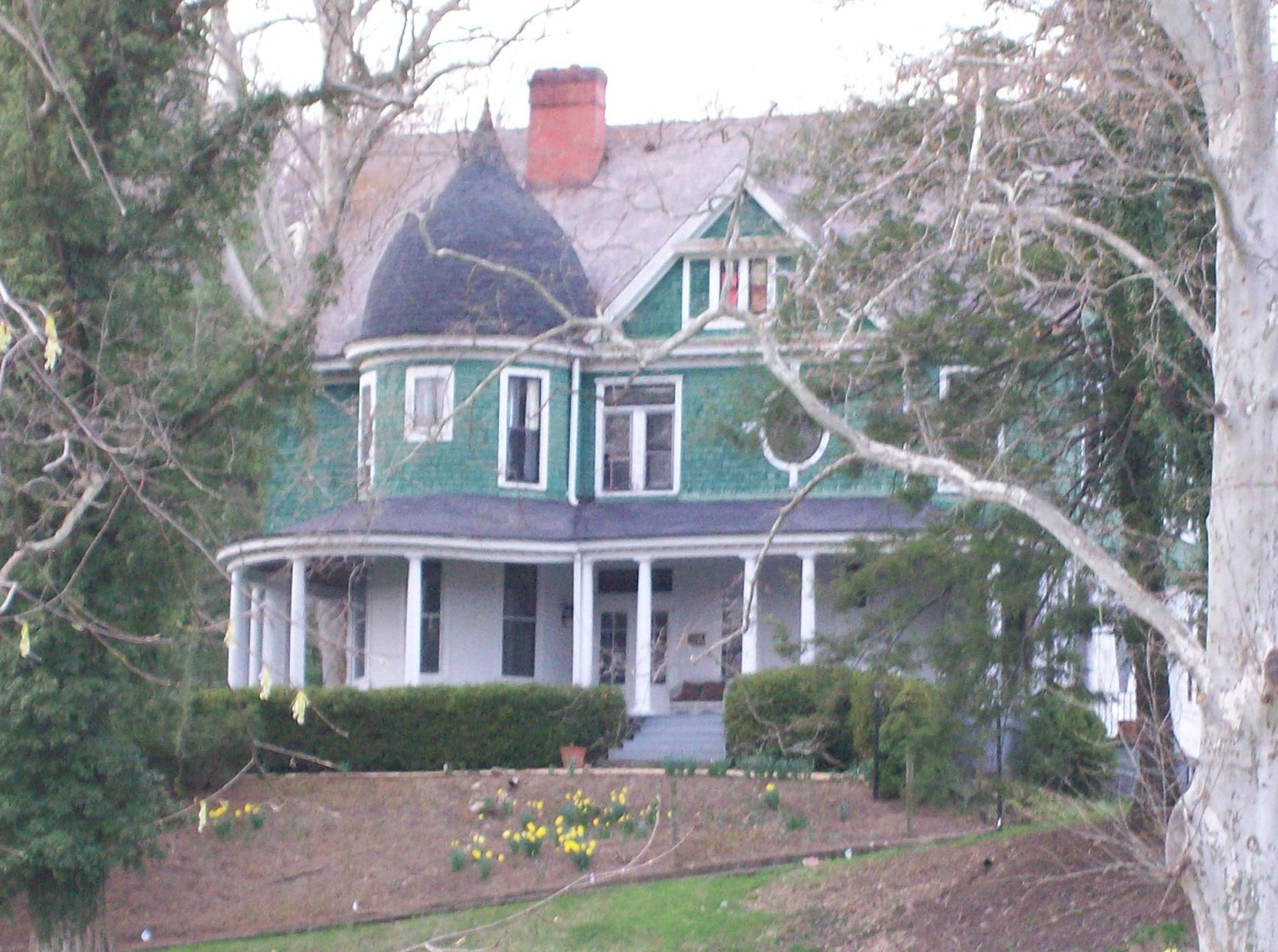
- H. C. Ogden House, April 2010

- Location within West Virginia Location within the United States
- Location: 12 Park Rd., Wheeling, West Virginia
- Coordinates: 40°5′15″N 80°41′43″W
- Area: 1 acre (0.40 ha)
- Built: 1893
- Architectural style: Queen Anne
- NRHP reference No.: 90001067
- Added to NRHP: July 12, 1990

H. C. Ogden House, also known as the Wise-Ogden House, is a historic home located at Wheeling, Ohio County, West Virginia. It was built in 1893, and is a 2 1/2-story, T-shaped, Queen Anne-style frame dwelling. It features a deep, full-width front porch with Doric order columns, a round tower with domed roof, and coursed wood shingles. The house has 5 bedrooms, 4 bathrooms, 1 half-bath, 1 kitchen, and 9 additional rooms. The house was built for Herschel Coombs Ogden (1869-1943), a publisher, community leader, and businessman significant in the history of West Virginia.

It was listed on the National Register of Historic Places in 1990. It is located in the Woodsdale-Edgwood Neighborhood Historic District.
