= Robert C. Woods House =

Historic house in West Virginia, United States

- U.S. National Register of Historic Places
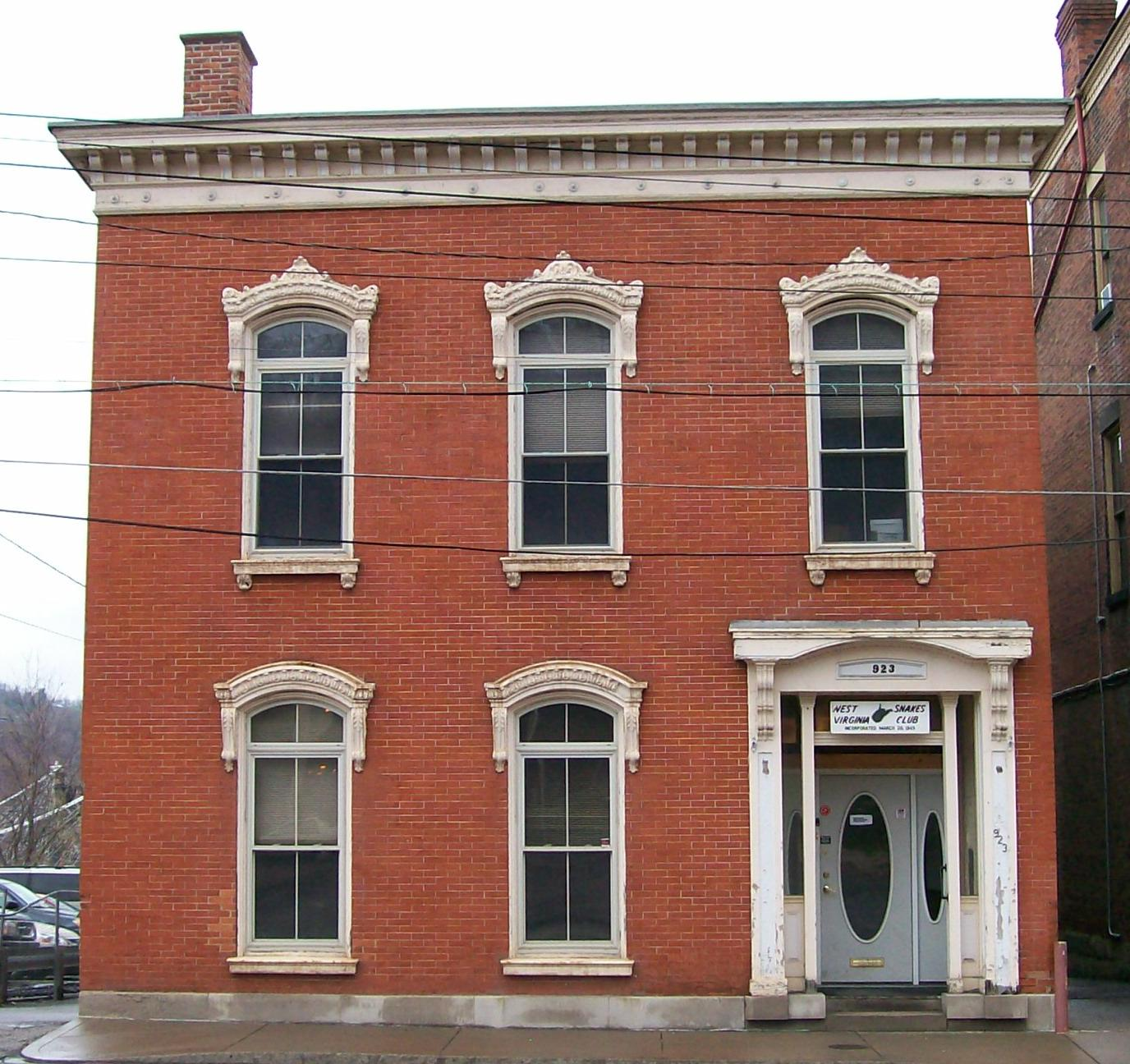
- Robert C Woods House, March 2010

- Location within West Virginia Location within the United States
- Location: 923 N. Main St., Wheeling, West Virginia
- Coordinates: 40°4′16″N 80°43′29″W
- Area: 0.2 acres (0.081 ha)
- Architectural style: Greek Revival, Italianate
- NRHP reference No.: 91000551
- Added to NRHP: May 2, 1991

Robert C. Woods House, also known as the Jacob S. Rhodes House, is a historic home located at Wheeling in Ohio County, West Virginia, United States. It was built between 1839 and 1845, and is a 2 1/2-story, 13-room brick dwelling, with an Italianate-style facade. It measures 32 feet by 90 feet, with a front block 45 feet deep and rear wing of 45 feet. The front facade features curved cast-iron lintels.

Home to some of Wheeling's more prominent past business leaders, it was listed on the National Register of Historic Places on May 2, 1991. This building now serves as a clubhouse for the West Virginia Snakes Club.
