= Chapline Street Row Historic District =

Historic district in West Virginia, United States

- U.S. National Register of Historic Places
- U.S. Historic district
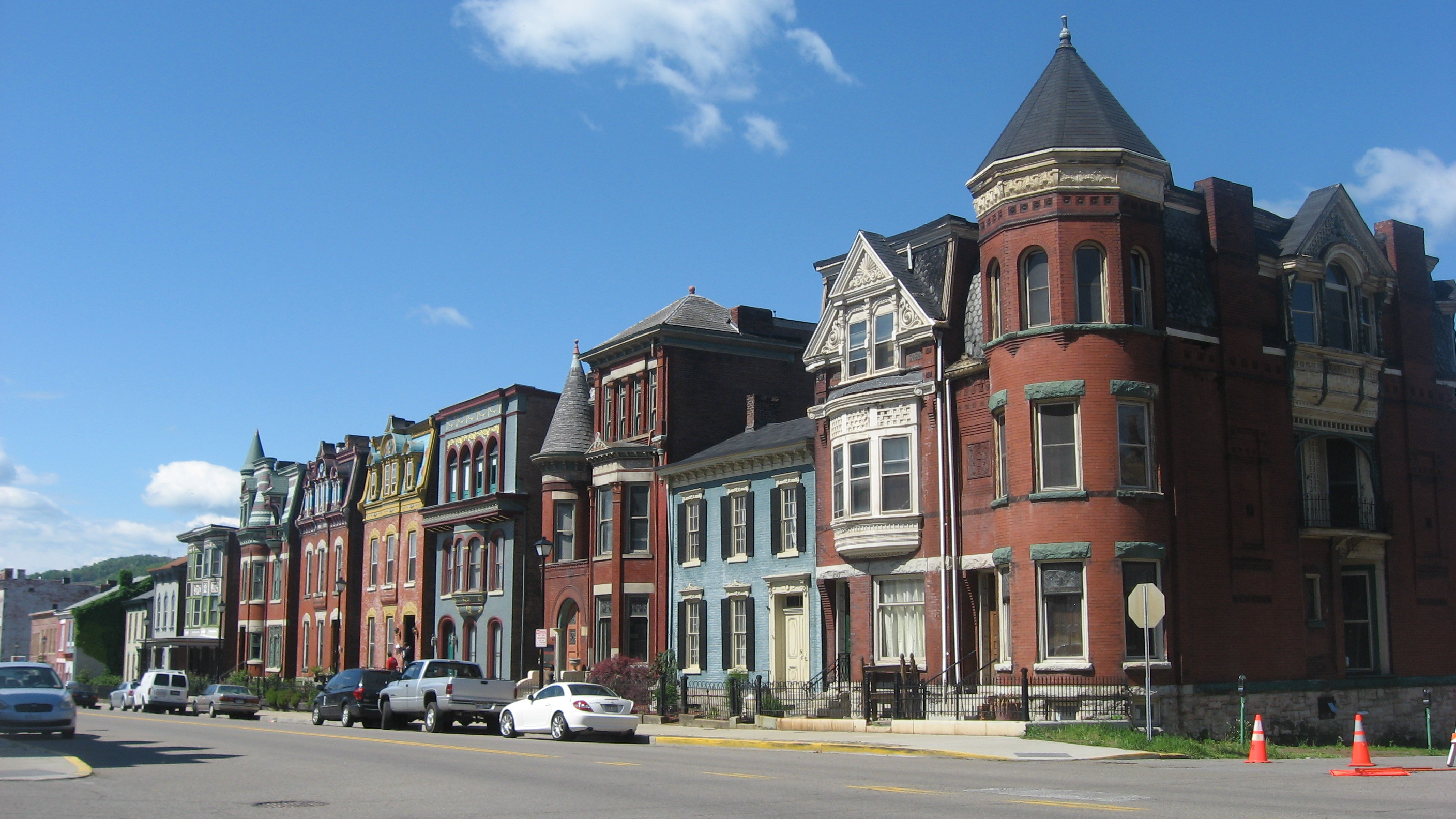
- Chapline Street Row Historic District, May 2013

- Location within West Virginia Location within the United States
- Location: 2301-2323 Chapline St., Wheeling, West Virginia
- Coordinates: 40°3′36″N 80°43′25″W
- Area: 0.7 acres (0.28 ha)
- Built: 1853
- Architect: E.W. Wells
- Architectural style: Late Victorian
- NRHP reference No.: 84003655
- Added to NRHP: January 12, 1984

Chapline Street Row Historic District is a national historic district located at Wheeling, Ohio County, West Virginia. The district encompasses 10 contributing buildings, including eight residences. All buildings are brick with sandstone foundations. The first building was built in 1853, with some buildings added through the 1870s, and the last in 1896. The houses are in the Late Victorian style and are considered an architectural "super block."

It was listed on the National Register of Historic Places in 1984.
