= Feay Inn =

- U.S. National Register of Historic Places
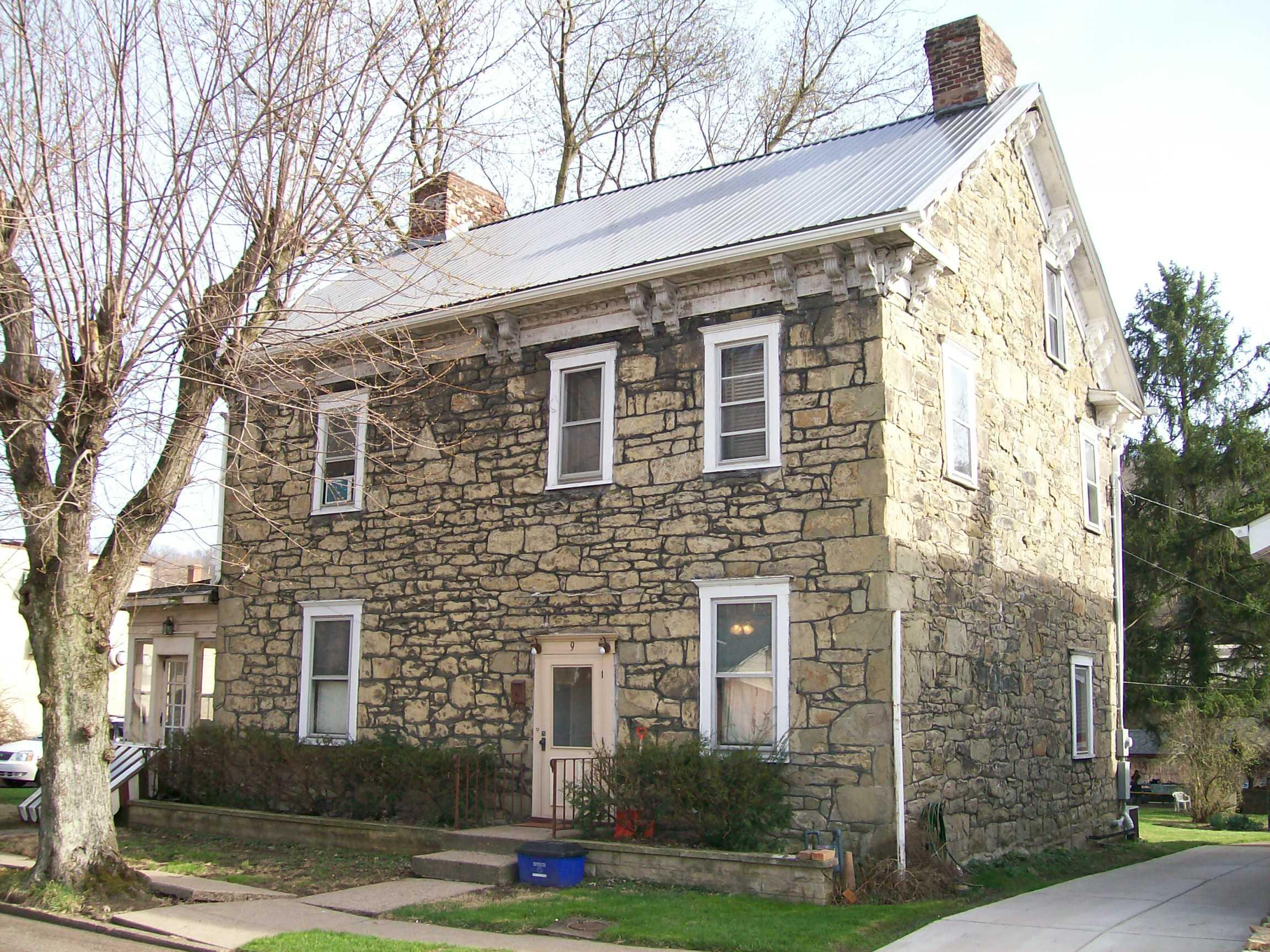
- Feay Inn, February 2006

- Location within West Virginia Location within the United States
- Location: 9 Burkham Ct., Wheeling, West Virginia
- Coordinates: 40°2′55″N 80°38′37″W
- Area: less than one acre
- Built: c. 1811
- Architectural style: I-house
- MPS: National Road MPS
- NRHP reference No.: 92000872
- Added to NRHP: February 11, 1993

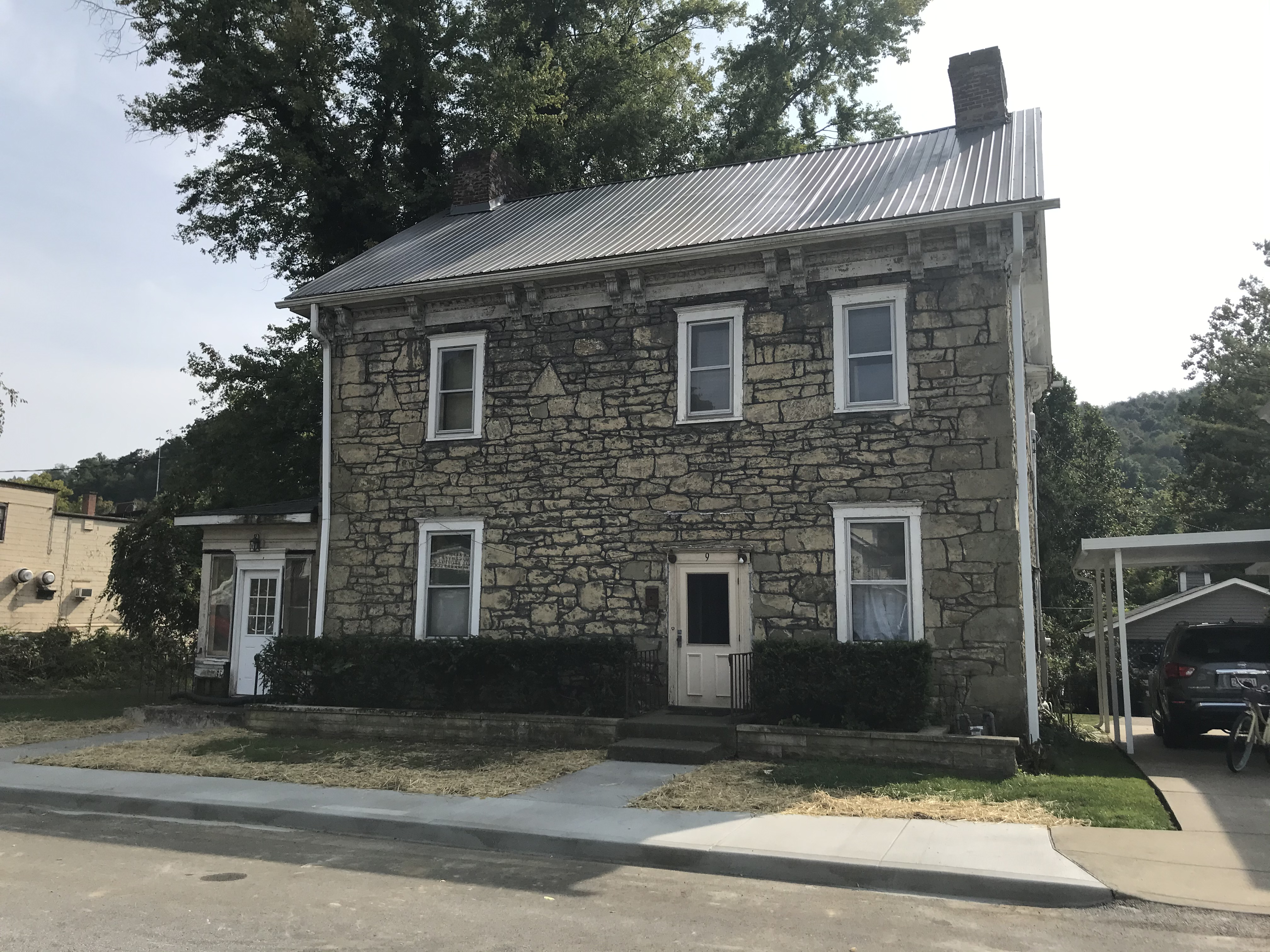
Feay Inn, October 2020

Feay Inn is a historic inn located at Wheeling, Ohio County, West Virginia. It was built about 1811, and is a 2 1/2-story I house-style fieldstone building. It was built to take advantage of the traffic using the National Road.

It was listed on the National Register of Historic Places in 1993.
