= National Road Corridor Historic District =

Historic district in West Virginia, United States

- U.S. National Register of Historic Places
- U.S. Historic district
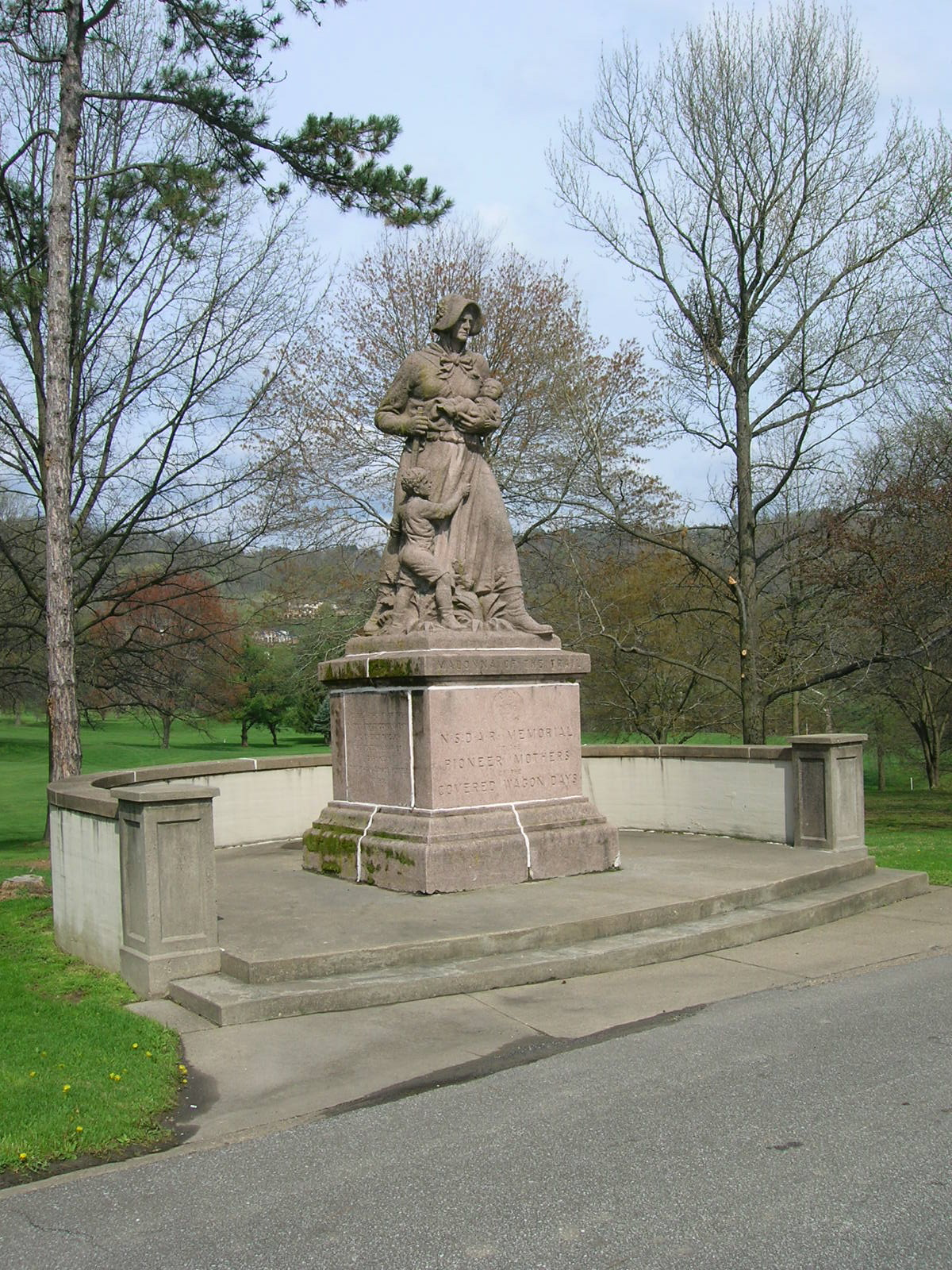
- Madonna of the Trail monument in Hornbrook Park

- Location within West Virginia Location within the United States
- Location: National Rd. from Bethany Pike to Park View Ln., Wheeling, West Virginia
- Coordinates: 40°3′53″N 80°40′40″W
- Area: 411 acres (166 ha)
- MPS: National Road MPS
- NRHP reference No.: 92000874
- Added to NRHP: February 11, 1993

The National Road Corridor Historic District is a historic district in eastern Wheeling, West Virginia. The district encompasses a 1.5-mile (2.4 km) section of the National Road from Park View Lane to Bethany Pike. A primarily residential area, the district includes the homes of some of Wheeling's wealthiest residents of the late 19th century and early 20th century. The homes are generally situated on large lots and were designed in popular architectural styles of the period, including Queen Anne, Colonial Revival, Italianate, Shingle Style, Classical Revival, Mission Revival, and Tudor Revival. Frederick F. Faris and Edward B. Franzheim, both significant Wheeling architects, each designed multiple homes along the road. The district also includes two cemeteries, Greenwood Cemetery and Mount Calvary Cemetery; Hornbrook Park (Wheeling Park), the site of a Madonna of the Trail monument and a Civil War memorial; Triadelphia High School, also designed by Faris; and three churches.

The district was added to the National Register of Historic Places on February 11, 1993.
