= Beagle Hotel =

- U.S. National Register of Historic Places
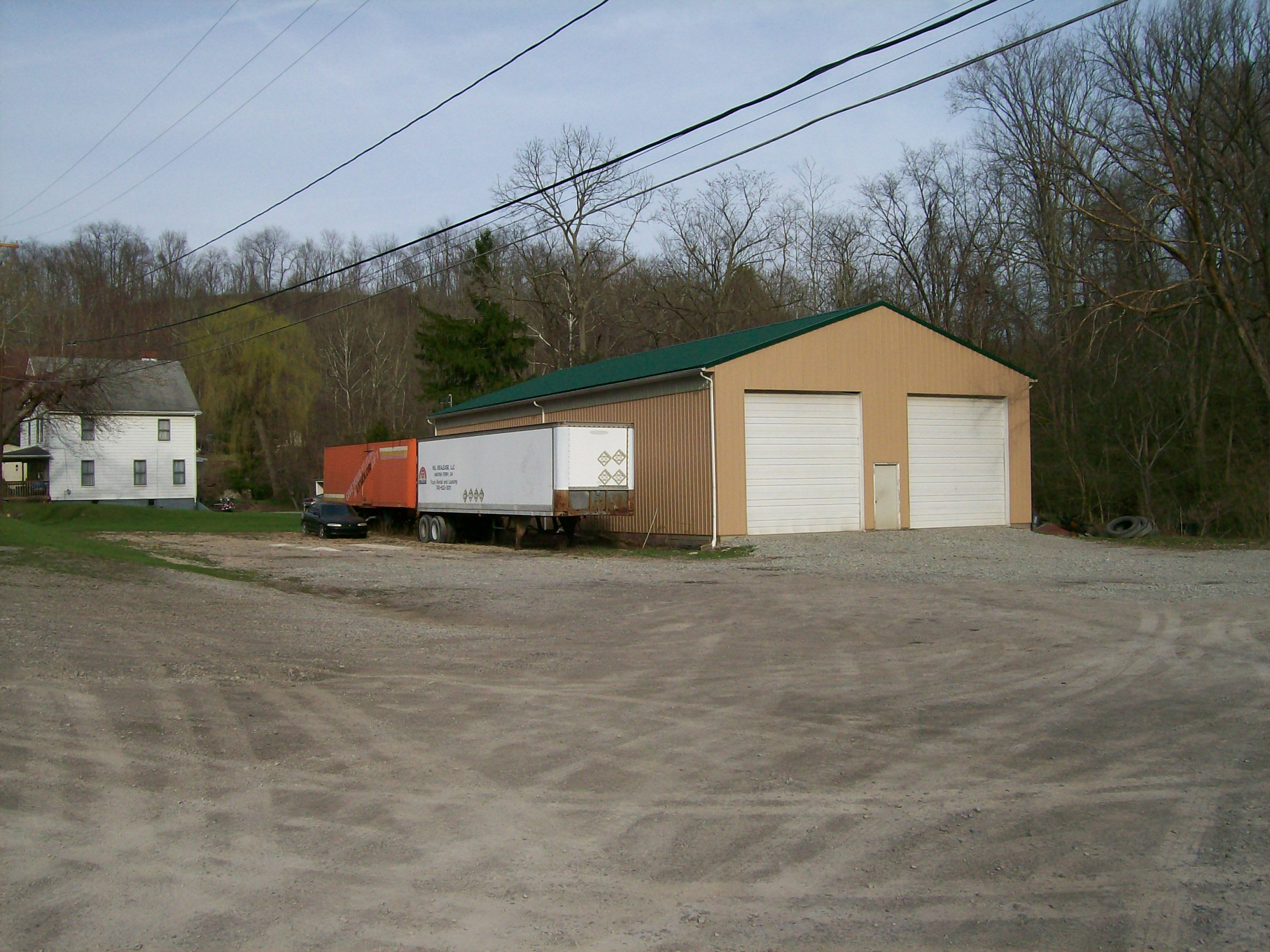
- Beagle Hotel Site, May 2010

- Location within West Virginia Location within the United States
- Location: 0.1 miles west of Valley Grove Rd. on the National Road, near Valley Grove, West Virginia
- Coordinates: 40°5′19″N 80°33′50″W
- Area: less than one acre
- Built: 1827
- Architectural style: Early Republic, Folk: Pre-Railroad
- MPS: National Road MPS
- NRHP reference No.: 92000863
- Added to NRHP: February 11, 1993

Beagle Hotel was a historic inn and tavern located near Valley Grove, Ohio County, West Virginia. It was built before 1827 and operated as the Beagle Hotel until 1893. Attached to the hotel was a general store. Both buildings were 2 1/2 stories high and covered in clapboard.

It was listed on the National Register of Historic Places in 1993. The buildings have since been destroyed.
