= Philip Hess House =

Historic house in Missouri, United States

- U.S. National Register of Historic Places
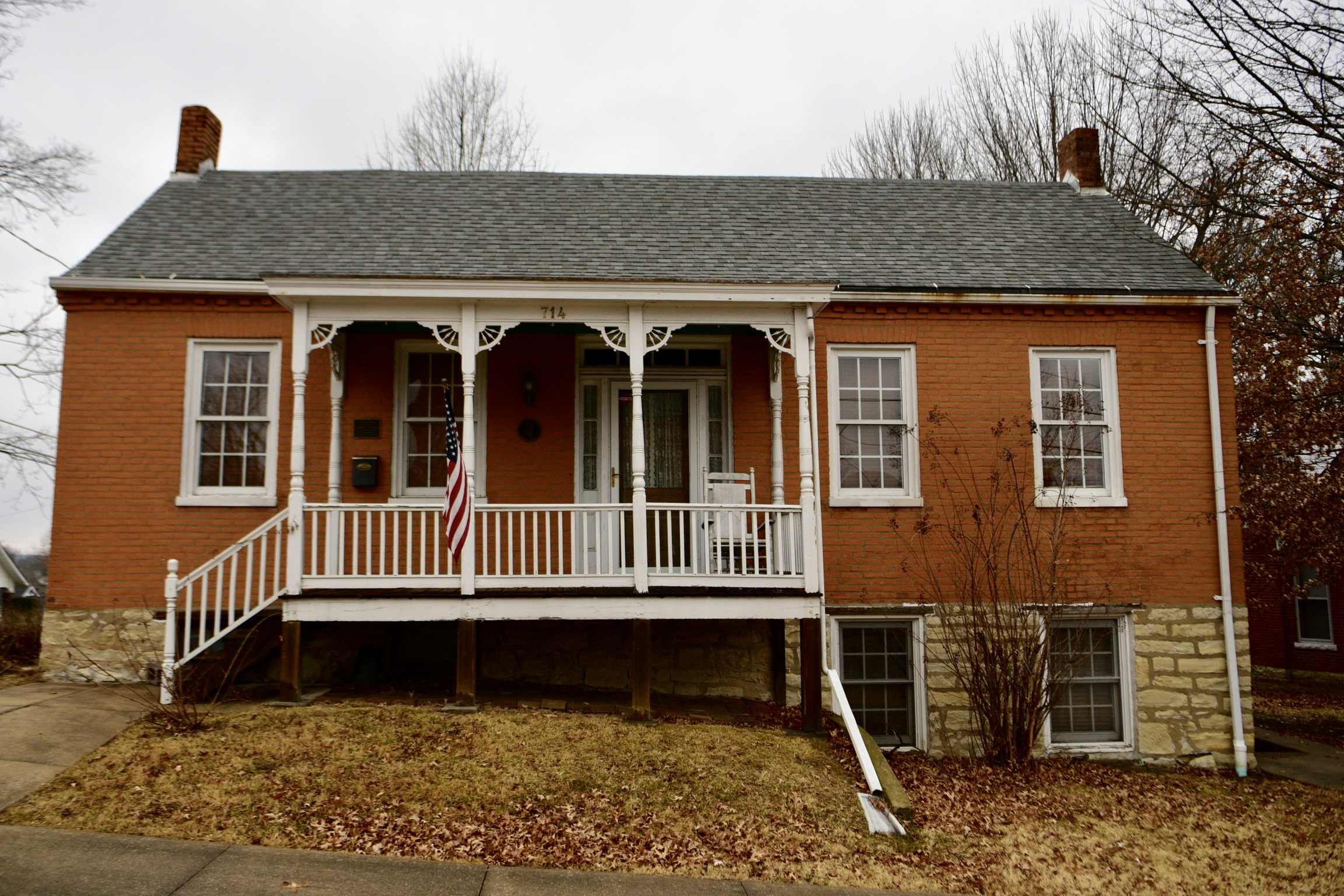

- Location within Missouri Location within the United States
- Interactive map showing the location for Philip Hess House
- Location: 714 Washington St., Jefferson City, Missouri
- Coordinates: 38°34′23″N 92°10′45″W
- Area: less than one acre
- Built: 1857-1864
- Architectural style: Missouri-German Vernacular
- MPS: Southside Munichburg, Missouri MPS
- NRHP reference No.: 02001304
- Added to NRHP: November 15, 2002

The Philip Hess House, also known as the Robert R. Jefferson House and Bowman House, is a historic home located in Jefferson City, Missouri. It was built between 1857 and 1864, and is a one-story, five-bay, Missouri-German Vernacular brick home. It has a gable roof and decorative brick cornice.

It was listed on the National Register of Historic Places in 2002.
