= Robert W. Hazlett House =

Historic house in West Virginia, United States

- U.S. National Register of Historic Places
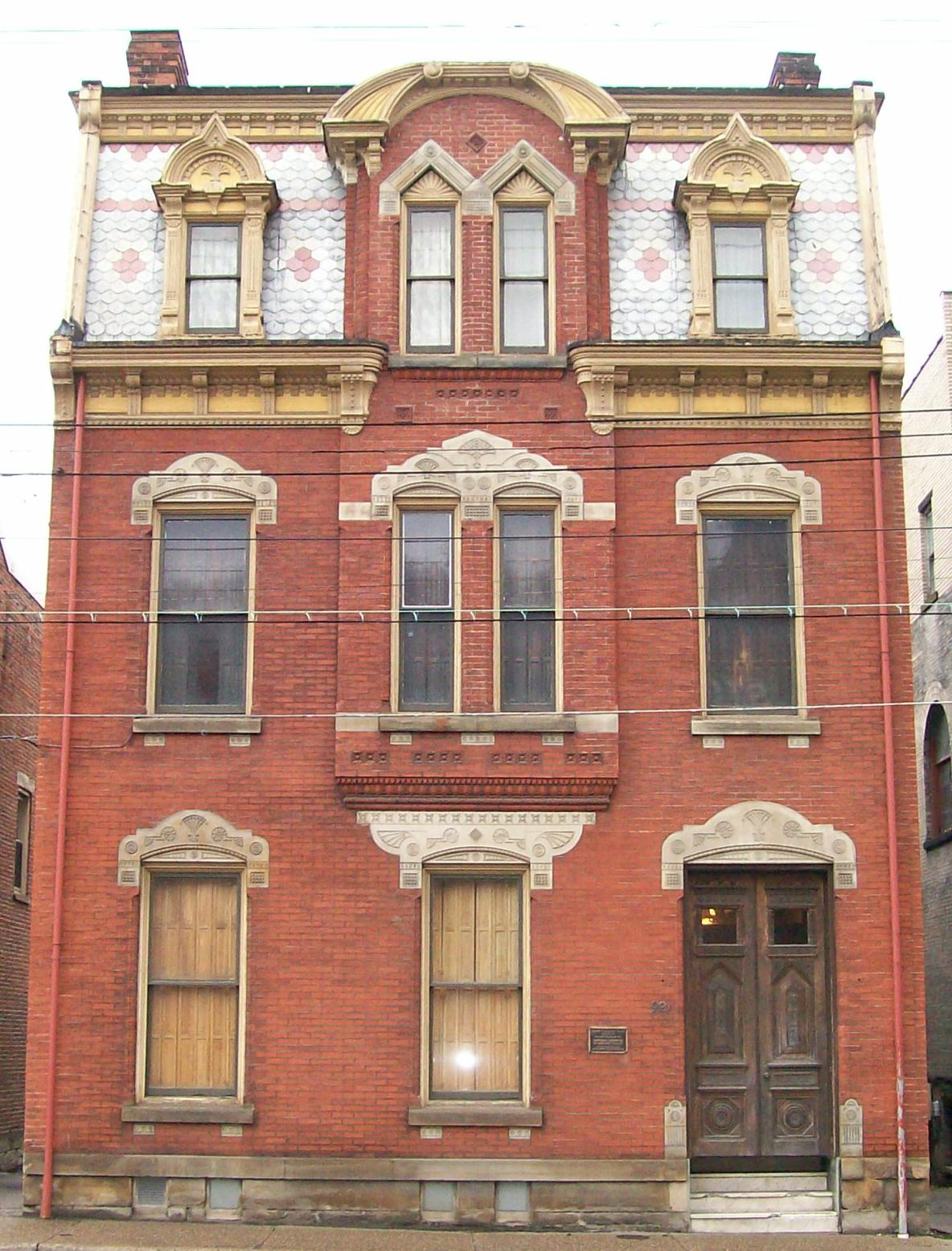
- Robert W. Hazlett House, March 2010

- Location within West Virginia Location within the United States
- Location: 921 N. Main St., Wheeling, West Virginia
- Coordinates: 40°3′44″N 80°43′29″W
- Area: 0.2 acres (0.081 ha)
- Built: 1887
- Architect: Wells, Edgar W.; Klieves, Kraft & Co.
- Architectural style: Second Empire, Queen Anne
- NRHP reference No.: 91000552
- Added to NRHP: May 2, 1991

Robert W. Hazlett House is a historic home located at Wheeling, Ohio County, West Virginia. It was built in 1887, and is a three-story Second Empire style brick residence measuring 30 feet (9.1 m) wide and 112 feet (34 m) deep. It features a central hooded bay and a polychrome slate-covered mansard roof. The interior has many Queen Anne style details. In 1991, it housed Friends of Wheeling, Inc., a private, non-profit, historic preservation organization and four apartments.

It was listed on the National Register of Historic Places in 1991.
