= Charles M. and Emma M. Fischer Fleshman House =

Historic house in Iowa, United States

- U.S. National Register of Historic Places
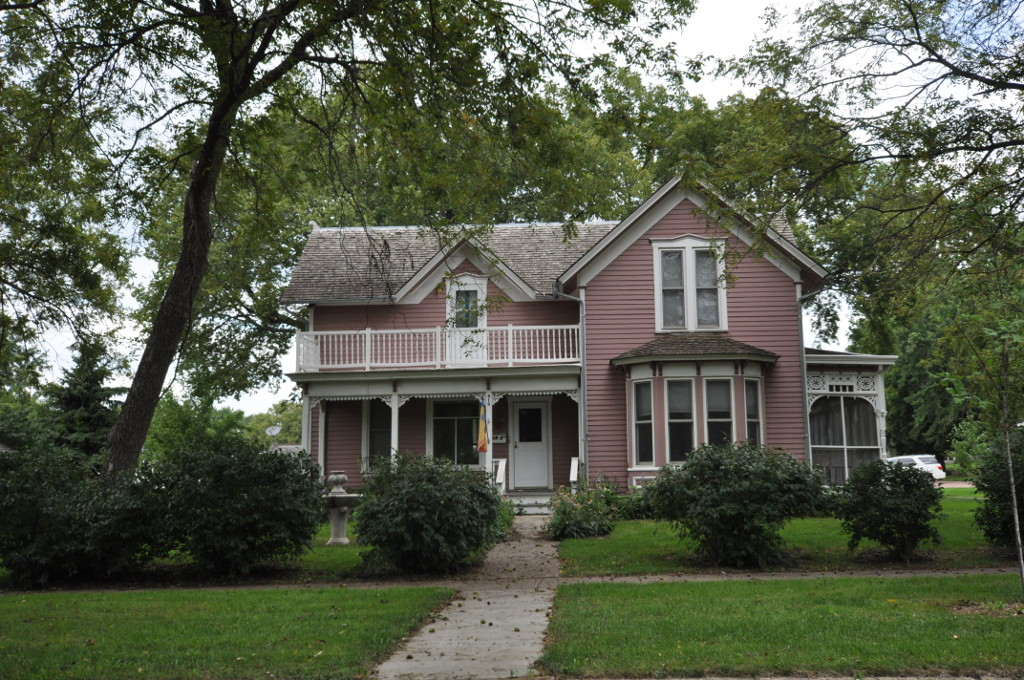

- Location within Iowa Location within the United States
- Location: 919 9th St. Hawarden, Iowa
- Coordinates: 42°59′44″N 96°28′52″W
- Area: less than one acre
- Built: 1889
- Architectural style: Victorian
- NRHP reference No.: 92001743
- Added to NRHP: January 7, 1993

The Charles M. and Emma M. Fischer Fleshman House is a historical residence located in Hawarden, Iowa, United States. Charles M. Fleshman was a leading businessman in the town from when he arrived in the mid-1880s and until his death in 1926. He had this 1½-story house built in 1889 and it was altered c. 1897–1905. It is a typical Victorian style house with influences from the Greek Revival, Italianate, Queen Anne and Vernacular styles. Alterations included the front porch. The 45-by-40-foot (14 by 12 m) frame structure features an irregular plan, cross gabled roof, and balloon frame. It was listed on the National Register of Historic Places in 1993.
