= Fischer House (Austin, Texas) =

Historic house in Texas, United States

- U.S. National Register of Historic Places
- Recorded Texas Historic Landmark
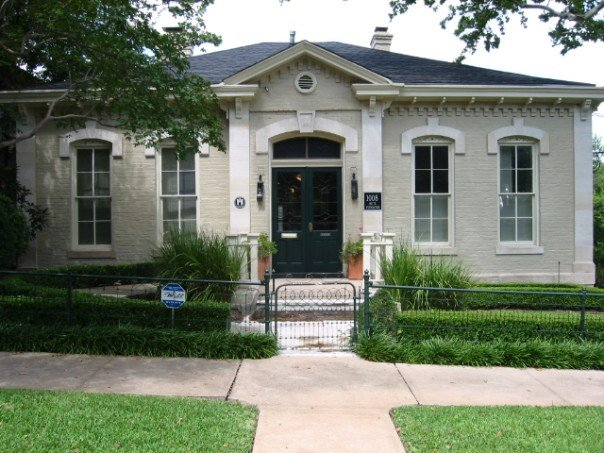
- Fischer House

- Location within Texas Location within the United States
- Location: 1008 West Ave., Austin, Texas, United States
- Coordinates: 30°16′28″N 97°44′56.5″W
- Built: 1882
- Architect: Joseph & Francis Fischer
- Architectural style: Greek Revival, Italianate
- NRHP reference No.: 82001741
- RTHL No.: 6452

Significant dates
- Added to NRHP: December 16, 1982
- Designated RTHL: 1982

The Fischer House is a historic mansion in downtown Austin, Texas, United States, completed in 1882. Its builder, Joseph Fischer, was a prominent mason in Austin at the time, and its bold high Victorian era, Italianate architecture and ornamentation reflect his family's skill in the trade. The home was the Fischer family's residence and office, and remained in the family until its sale in 1938.

The home is located at 1008 West Avenue. It was listed on the National Register of Historic Places on December 16, 1982. The house was listed as a City of Austin Historic Landmark in 1978 as the Burlage-Fischer House.
