= Elmer Hess House =

Historic house in Ohio, United States

- U.S. National Register of Historic Places
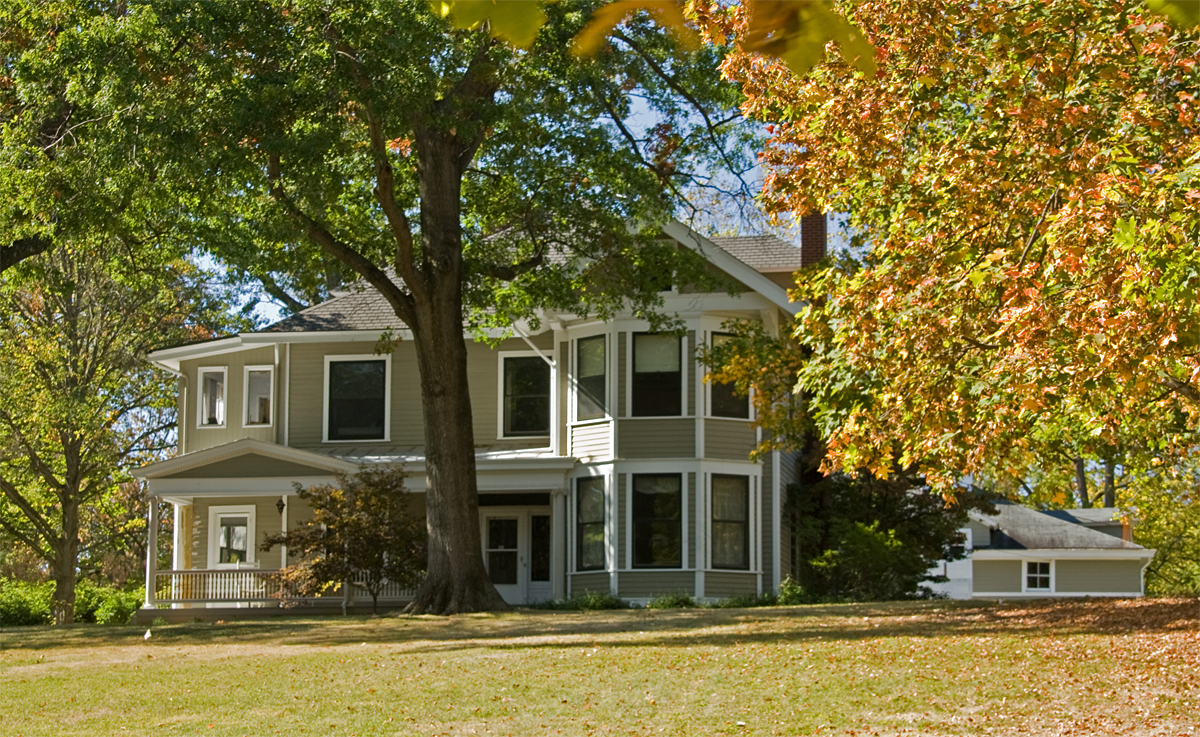
- Front of the house

- Location within Ohio Location within the United States
- Location: 333 Springfield Pike, Wyoming, Ohio
- Coordinates: 39°13′26″N 84°28′25″W
- Area: 1.9 acres (0.77 ha)
- Built: 1900
- Architectural style: Queen Anne
- MPS: Wyoming MRA
- NRHP reference No.: 86001633
- Added to NRHP: August 25, 1986

The Elmer Hess House is a historic residence in the city of Wyoming, Ohio, United States. Erected in the late nineteenth century, it was originally the home of a Cincinnati industrialist, and it has been designated a historic site because of its distinctive architecture.

== Architecture ==
Built of weatherboarded walls on a stone foundation, the house is covered by a slate roof. Two stories tall, the frame Hess House mixes details of the Queen Anne and Colonial Revival styles. The facade features a veranda-style porch with a delicate balustrade and Ionic columns. Underneath the porch roof, the main entrance is surrounded by large sidelights, while a transom window of leaded glass sits above the doorway. The overall floor plan is that of the letter "L", divided into four bays on the front and three on the sides.

== Historic context ==
Good transportation is a leading reason for Wyoming's prosperity. The city lies near the old pre-statehood road that connected Cincinnati with locations farther north, such as Fort Hamilton and Fallen Timbers. Curves in the road were cut off in 1806, forming a new road that is today followed by Springfield Pike through central Wyoming. Improvements in the 1830s only enhanced its importance. By this time, another mode of transportation had become significant: the Miami and Erie Canal was built a short distance to the east in 1828, and the village of Lockland grew up along its side. Railroads reached the city in 1851 with the construction of the Cincinnati, Hamilton, and Dayton Railroad on the border between Lockland and Wyoming.

Because of Wyoming's proximity to the industry of Lockland, its easy transportation to the booming city of Cincinnati, and its pleasant scenery, many wealthy industrialists purchased local farms and built grand country houses. Most such houses were built in the Wyoming Hills area, west of Springfield Pike; growth in this area continued until the coming of the Great Depression. Hess was typical of these industrialists, being the president of the Spring and Axle Company in Cincinnati's Carthage neighborhood; he lived in the house from its construction in 1900 until 1911.

== Historic site ==
In 1979, a local historic preservation group began a citywide survey to identify Wyoming's historic buildings, and this effort culminated with a multiple property submission of eighteen houses, the Wyoming Presbyterian Church, and one historic district to the National Register of Historic Places in 1985. Along with all but one of the other properties, the Hess House was listed on the Register in the following year, qualifying because of its historically significant architecture and because of its connection to Hess.
