= Fischer-Lasch Farmhouse =

Historic house in West Virginia, United States

- U.S. National Register of Historic Places
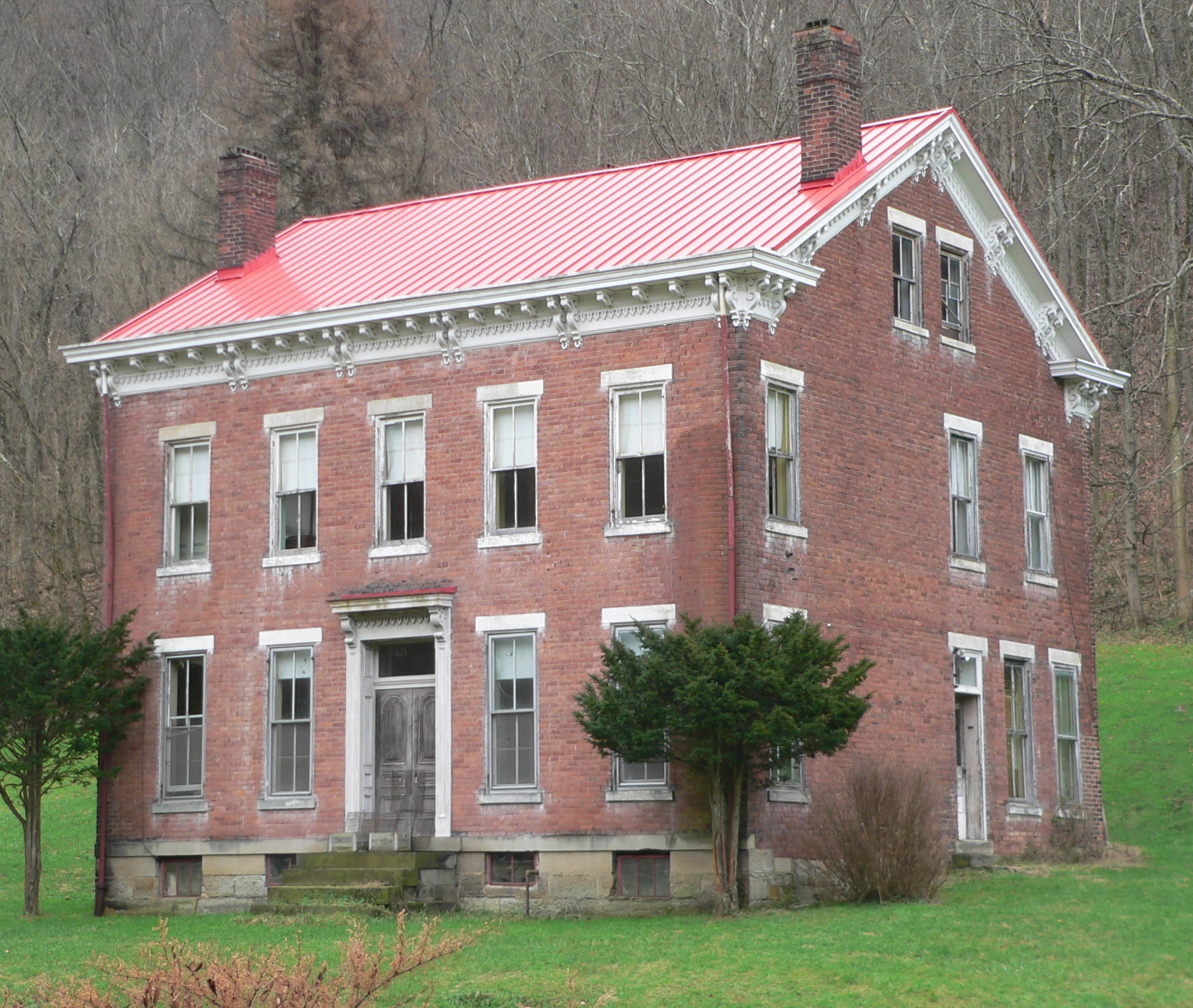

- Location within West Virginia Location within the United States
- Location: 100 Waddles Run Rd., Wheeling, West Virginia
- Coordinates: 40°5′15″N 80°40′43″W
- Area: 3 acres (1.2 ha)
- Built: 1884
- Architectural style: Italianate, I-House
- NRHP reference No.: 95000875
- Added to NRHP: July 21, 1995

Fischer-Lasch Farmhouse, also known as Hillwood Dairy Farm, is a historic farmhouse located at Wheeling, Ohio County, West Virginia. It was built in 1884, and is a 2 1/2-story I house-style red-brick dwelling in the Italianate style.

It was listed on the National Register of Historic Places in 1995.
