= Lang-Hess House =

Historic house in West Virginia, United States

- U.S. National Register of Historic Places
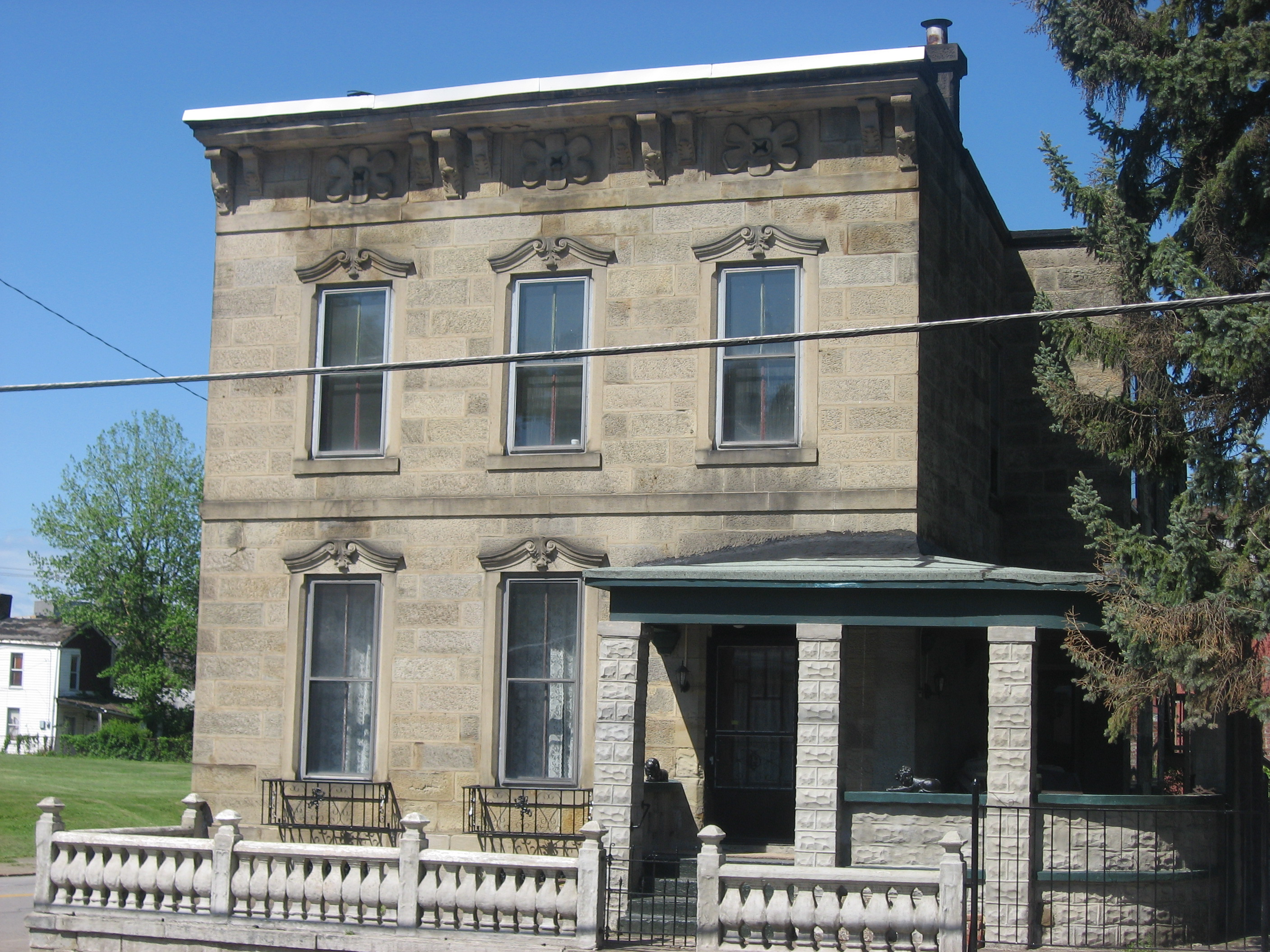
- View from the northeast, across Wood Street

- Location within West Virginia Location within the United States
- Location: 1625 Wood St., Wheeling, West Virginia
- Coordinates: 40°3′50″N 80°42′54″W
- Area: less than one acre
- Built: 1865
- Architect: Andrew J. Lang
- Architectural style: Italianate
- NRHP reference No.: 06000174
- Added to NRHP: March 22, 2006

Lang-Hess House is a historic home located at Wheeling, Ohio County, West Virginia. It was built about 1865, and is a two-story sandstone building with Italianate design details. An attached ‘sun porch’ was added to the house about 1935. Its builder was associated with the architect and engineers of the Wheeling Suspension Bridge, and is believed to have used “extra” sandstone to build his residence following the work on bridge.

It was listed on the National Register of Historic Places in 2006.
