= Wheeling Warehouse Historic District =

Historic district in West Virginia, United States

- U.S. National Register of Historic Places
- U.S. Historic district
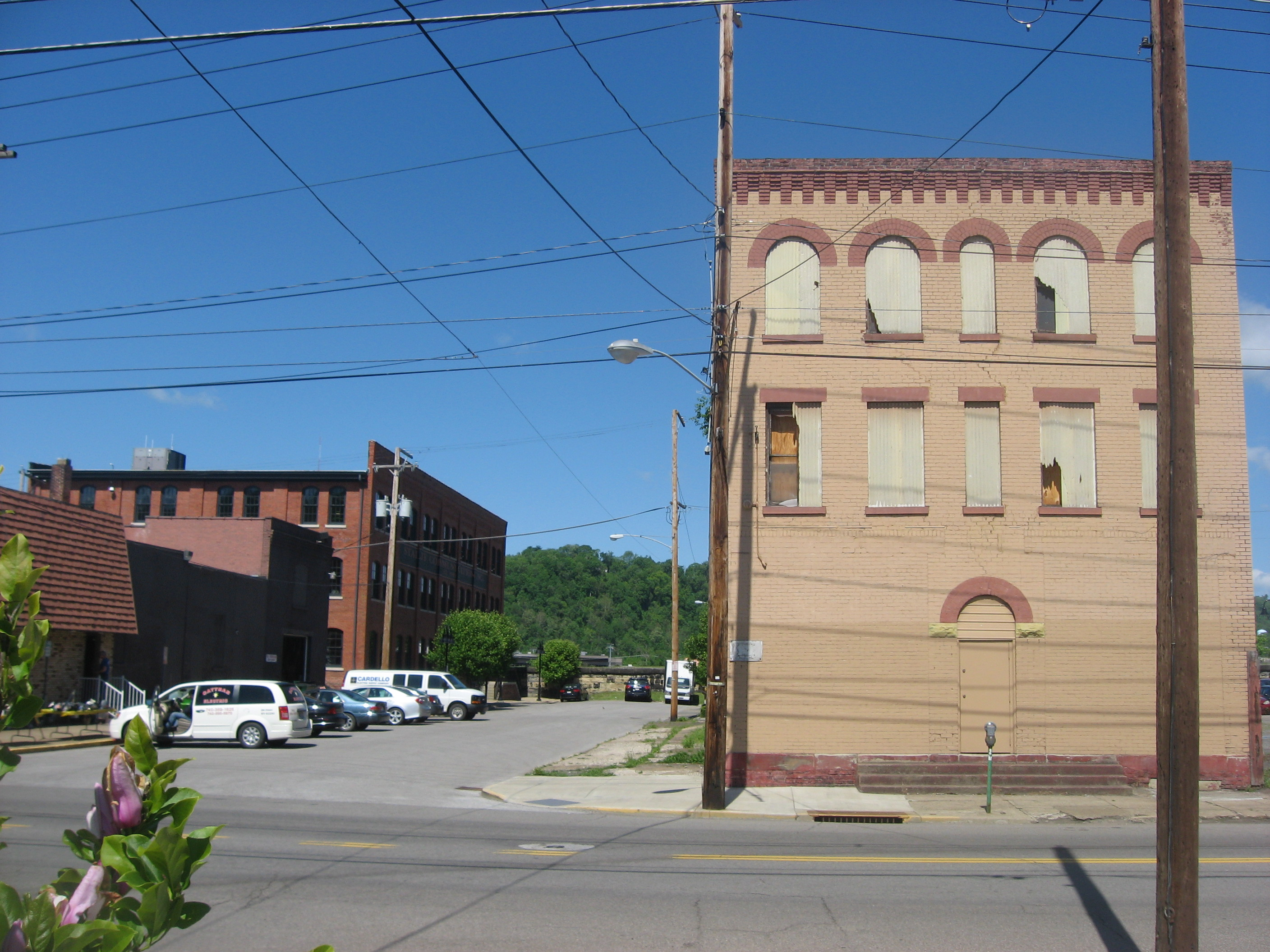
- Main and 22nd Streets

- Location within West Virginia Location within the United States
- Location: Roughly along Main St., Water St., 21 St., 22nd St., South St., 18th St., Eoff St. and Chapline St., Wheeling, West Virginia
- Coordinates: 40°3′39″N 80°43′22″W
- Area: 49.3 acres (20.0 ha)
- Built: 1852
- Architect: Long, M.A.; et al.
- Architectural style: Early Commercial, Moderne
- NRHP reference No.: 02001530 (original); 100007606 (increase)

Significant dates
- Added to NRHP: December 16, 2002
- Boundary increase: April 14, 2022

Wheeling Warehouse Historic District is a national historic district located at Wheeling, Ohio County, West Virginia. The district includes 20 contributing buildings and 11 contributing structures. They are warehouses and commercial style buildings and structures between Main Street and the Ohio River. All of the buildings date to the late-19th and early-20th century. The warehouses are mostly two- and three-story masonry buildings. The two-story commercial buildings have storefronts on the first floor and residential units above. Notable buildings and structures include the Pump Store (1933), Wheeling Stamping Plant (1932), Allied Plate Glass (c. 1920), Warwick China (c. 1887), Boury Warehouse (c. 1894), Ott-Heiskell Company (c. 1871), Edward Wagner Wholesale Grocers building (1915), the Moderne style former Greyhound Bus Station, and Main Street Bridge (1891).

It was listed on the National Register of Historic Places in 2002, with a boundary increase in 2022.
