= Stratford Springs =

- Wheeling Country Club
- U.S. National Register of Historic Places
- U.S. Historic district
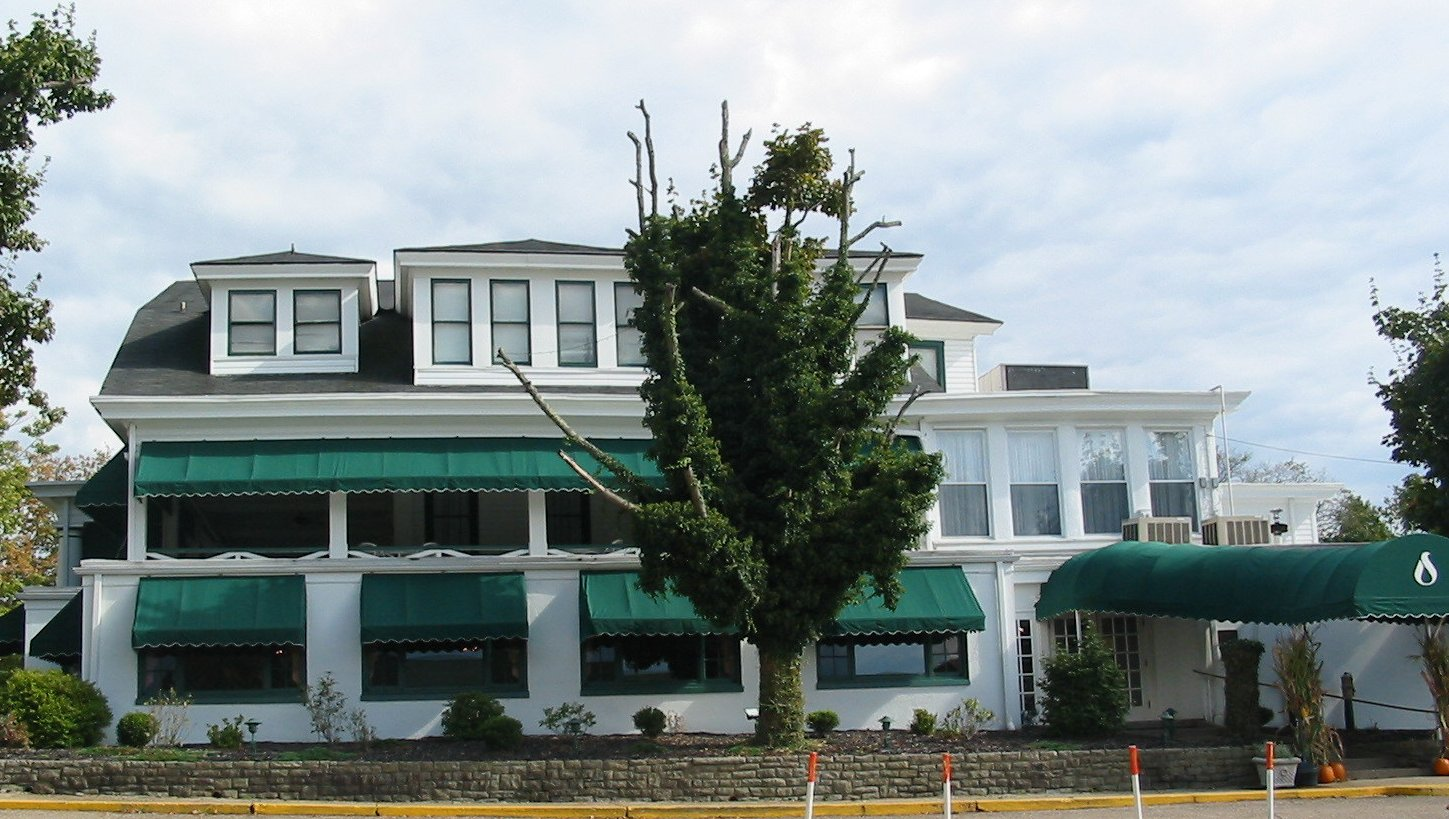
- Stratford Springs in 2006

- Location within West Virginia Location within the United States
- Location: 355 Oglebay Dr., near Wheeling, West Virginia
- Coordinates: 40°5′28″N 80°40′56″W
- Area: 4.5 acres (1.8 ha)
- Built: 1902, 1905, 1936
- Architect: Frederick Faris; Edward Bates Franzheim
- Architectural style: Bungalow/Craftsman; Shingle Style
- NRHP reference No.: 90000711
- Added to NRHP: April 26, 1990

Stratford Springs, located near Wheeling, Ohio County, West Virginia, US, is a nationally recognized historic district called the Wheeling Country Club. The country club operated from this location until 1980 when it moved to its present facilities. The district includes four contributing buildings; the former Club House (1902), Franzheim Bungalow, the former Pro and Caddy House, and the former Servant's Residence. The former clubhouse was designed by noted Wheeling architect Frederick F. Faris (1870-1927). Hole 13 green and hole 14 teeing ground now abut the former clubhouse. The historic district was listed on the National Register of Historic Places in 1990.
