= North Wheeling Historic District =

Historic district in West Virginia, United States

- U.S. National Register of Historic Places
- U.S. Historic district
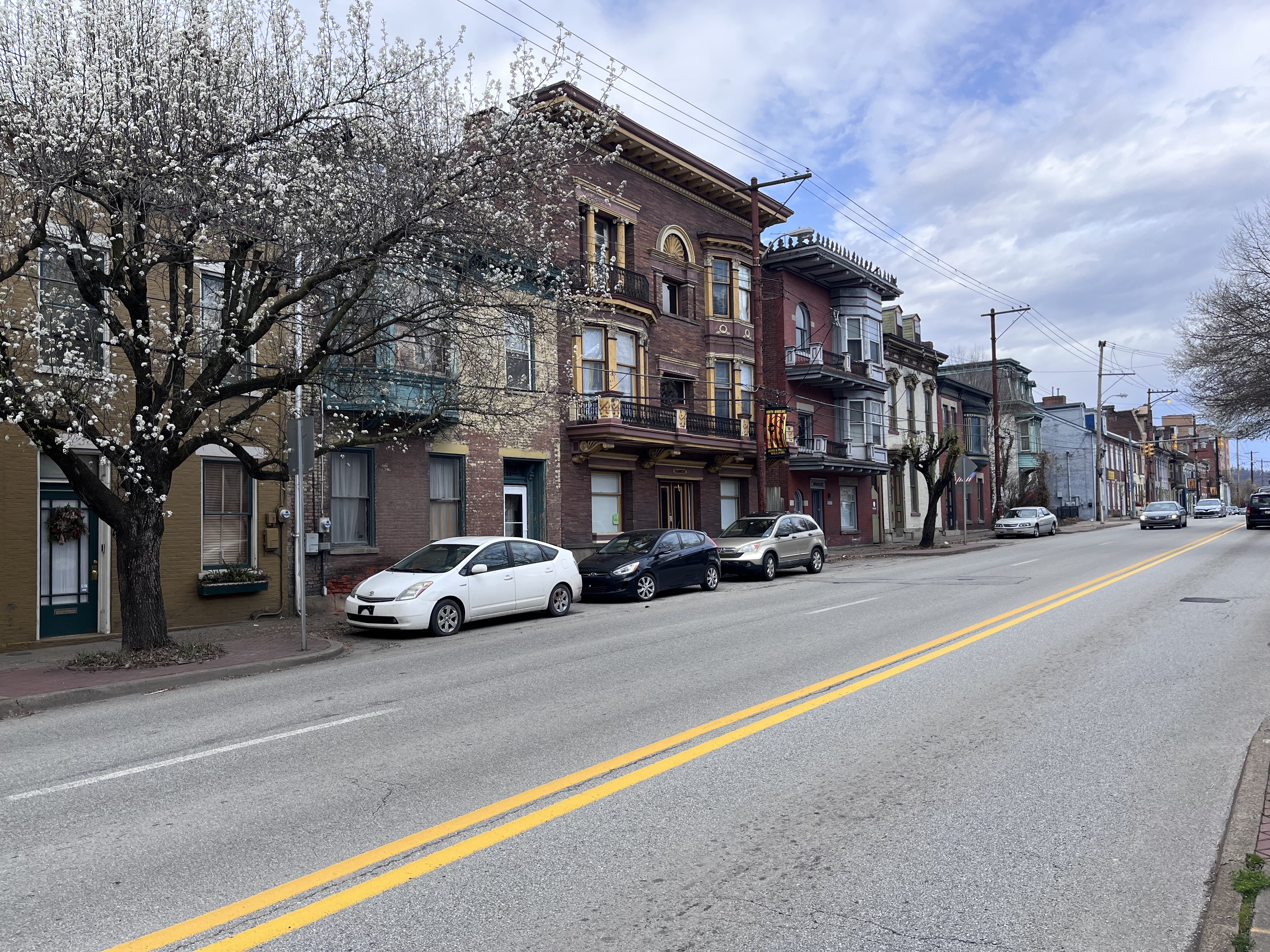
- Buildings in North Wheeling, March 2023

- Location within West Virginia Location within the United States
- Location: Roughly bounded by Main Street Ter., Market St., Interstate 70, and N. Main St., Wheeling, West Virginia
- Coordinates: 40°4′28″N 80°43′29″W
- Area: 15 acres (6.1 ha)
- Architect: Howard, S.M.; Et al.
- Architectural style: Greek Revival, Late Victorian, Italianate
- NRHP reference No.: 88002693 (original); 07001419 (increase 1); 100008073 (increase 2)

Significant dates
- Added to NRHP: December 9, 1988
- Boundary increases: January 17, 2008; August 29, 2022

North Wheeling Historic District is a national historic district located at Wheeling, Ohio County, West Virginia. The district encompasses 134 contributing buildings and one contributing object in a 2 1/2-block section of northern Wheeling, known as "Old Town". Most of the district consists of mid-to late-19th-century residential buildings. A number of popular architectural styles are represented, including Greek Revival, Italianate, and Late Victorian. Notable buildings include the Vigilant Engine House (c. 1891), William Goering House (1885), Alfred Paull House (1880s), Williams Duplex Tenement (1880–1884), George W. Eckhart House (1891–1892), Christian Hess House (1876), Edward Hazlett House (1893), Henry K. List House (1858). The object is the Pollack Memorial Monument (1916).

It was listed on the National Register of Historic Places in 1988, with boundary increases in 2008 and 2022.
