= Slim Lehart =

- Also known as: The Wheeling Cat
- Born: Richard E. Hartley; June 25, 1935; Viola, West Virginia, U.S.
- Died: August 5, 2023 (aged 88) Wheeling, West Virginia, U.S.
- Genres: Country; talking blues; folk
- Occupations: Singer, musician, entertainer
- Instruments: Voice, guitar, mandolin
- Years active: 1965–2017

Richard Edmond Hartley (June 25, 1935 – August 5, 2023), mostly known by his stage names Slim Lehart or "The Wheeling Cat," was an American country music singer and entertainer. Lehart is best known for his tenure as a member of the original Wheeling Jamboree (WWVA), the second oldest country music radio broadcast in the United States. Lehart first appeared on the Jamboree as a guest in 1965 alongside fellow musicians Charlie Moore and Bill Napier.Up until his death in 2023, he maintained status as a lifetime member of the Jamboree, with a star bearing his name outside of the Capitol Theatre in Wheeling.

Lehart is a nominee for the West Virginia Music Hall of Fame.

== Early life ==
Richard Edmond Hartley was born on June 25, 1935, in Viola, West Virginia, south of Wheeling. He is a native of the rural community of Calis, West Virginia, and grew up there.

== Career ==
Lehart first appeared on the Jamboree as a guest in 1965. His first appearance included backing instrumentals from bluegrass musicians Charlie Moore and Bill Napier.

Lehart continued to make guest appearances until 1970 when he signed on as a cast member.

In 1965, Johnny Cash opened up for him before a show in Nashville.

In 1970, Slim became the first new performer in the Jamboree to be signed to a contract. His other nickname "The Wheeling Cat," came from one of his signature songs. Lehart soon became one of the most popular regulars of the Jamboree, even being described as the West Virginia version of Elvis Presley.

As a member of the Wheeling Jamboree, Lehart has also performed with musicians like Merle Haggard.

== Legacy ==
On November 24, 2014, Lehart was awarded a star with his name on the Capitol Theatre's Walkway of Stars in Wheeling, which dubbed him a "Lifetime Member" of the Jamboree.

On June 25, 2021, Wheeling mayor Glenn Elliott issued a proclamation declaring that April 7, 2021, mark "Slim Lehart Day" in Wheeling. The same proclamation was also issued the following year to celebrate Lehart's legacy.

== Discography ==
=== Singles and EPs ===
- "Sunshine In My Soul" (Deneba Records, 1972; written by Jan Crutchfield)
- "Just Before Goodbye" (Deneba Records, 1972; written by Allen Reynolds and J. Surber)

=== Albums ===
- The Wheeling Cat (B-W Records, LP, Album)

== Retirement and personal life ==
Lehart resided in Wheeling up until his death, and retired from music in 2017 after his wife died. Lehart was still a regular of the Jamboree up until 2005.

He performed once in August 2017 shortly after his retirement for a special concert.

== Death ==
Lehart died on August 5, 2023, at a hospice care center in Wheeling, West Virginia, at the age of 88.
