= Calis =

Calis may refer to:

- Calis, West Virginia
- Natasha Calis, Canadian actress
- Center for Active Learning in International Studies (CALIS), a K-12 outreach program sponsored by the University of Southern California
- China Academic Library and Information System
- Calis, also known as Arnis, is the national sport and martial art of the Philippines

== See also ==
- Çalış (disambiguation)
