= WKKX =

- Wheeling, West Virginia; United States
- Broadcast area: Wheeling, West Virginia; St. Clairsville, Ohio
- Frequency: 1600 kHz
- Branding: AM 1600 WKKX

Programming
- Format: News/Talk/Sports
- Affiliations: Cleveland Browns Radio Network; Fox Sports Radio

Ownership
- Owner: RCK 1 Group, LLC
- Sister stations: WVLY

History
- First air date: 1963
- Former call signs: WUNI; WZMM; WOHZ

Technical information
- Licensing authority: FCC
- Facility ID: 72172
- Class: D
- Power: 5,000 Watts daytime 33 Watts nighttime
- Transmitter coordinates: 40°5′26.3″N 80°42′10.3″W
- Translators: W251CY (98.1 MHz, Wheeling)

Links
- Public license information: Public file; LMS
- Webcast: WKKX Webstream
- Website: WKKX Online

WKKX is a News/Talk/Sports formatted broadcast radio station licensed to Wheeling, West Virginia, United States, serving Wheeling in West Virginia and St. Clairsville in Ohio. WKKX is owned and operated by RCK 1 Group, LLC.

== Programming ==
WKKX is a locally owned station that features local news talk. Notable hosts are Howard Monroe, Steve Novotney, and Bill DiFabio.

In 2009, the long-running Jamboree radio program moved from its longtime home of WWVA, where it had aired from 1933 until its cancellation in the mid-2000s, to WKKX. The Jamboree is the third-longest-running radio program in the US behind the Grand Ole Opry and Music and the Spoken Word. The Jamboree moved to WWOV-LP no later than 2016.

Daily programming is simulcast on both AM 1600 WKKX and AM 1370 WVLY between 6am-10am and 2pm-6pm.

WKKX is an affiliate of SB Nation, carrying its programming overnight.

== Translator ==
Broadcast translator for WKKX
Call sign	Frequency	City of license	FID	ERP (W)	HAAT	Class	Transmitter coordinates	FCC info
W251CY	98.1 FM	Wheeling, West Virginia	200384	43	114 m (374 ft)	D	40°5′25.3″N 80°42′8″W	LMS
