= Bill Beach (rockabilly musician) =

American musician (1932–2024)

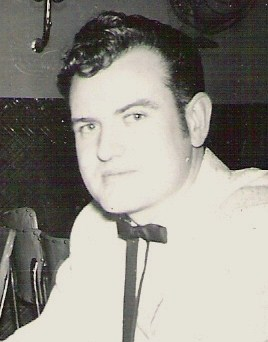
- Beach in 1956

Background information
- Born: William Robert Beach; August 8, 1932; Glencoe, Kentucky, U.S.
- Died: October 28, 2024 (aged 92) Hamilton, Ohio, U.S.
- Genres: Country
- Occupation: Singer
- Instrument: Guitar
- Labels: King Records

William Robert Beach (August 8, 1932 – October 28, 2024), also known as Bill "Peg Pants" Beach and Frog Beach, was an American musician.

"Peg Pants"
"Peg Pants" by Bill "Peg Pants" Beach, on King Records – Cincinnati, OH (1956)

== Early years ==
Beach was born in Glencoe, Kentucky, on August 8, 1932. He began his musical career as a teenager after borrowing a guitar from his cousin to learn a few chords. In 1948, he appeared several times as a guest on the country music radio show "Shorty and Sally Fincher Jamboree Show" out of Wheeling, West Virginia, and traveled the region (including York, Pennsylvania) with the WWVA Jamboree during the summer of 1948 with country music stars like Hank Williams Sr., Hank Snow and Little Jimmy Dickens. Later in 1948, he was finally able to buy his own Martin D-28 guitar.

Touring with this regional country music radio station heightened his interest in music and after graduating from high school in 1951, Beach moved to Cincinnati, Ohio, to live with his mother in hopes of pursuing a musical career. He began recording at the old Wurlitzer Music Studios in Cincinnati where he met and recorded with Skeeter Davis. His recordings during this time were unreleased.

== King Record days ==
In November 1952, during the Korean War, Beach enlisted into the United States Marine Corps. His musical career was placed on hold until he was honorably discharged in November, 1955 and returned to Cincinnati, Ohio where he began a recording career with King Records. In June 1956, he wrote and recorded the rockabilly hit "Peg Pants" at King. The B-side of the record, "You're Gonna Like Me Baby" also had some radio success.

Beach continued writing songs and performing until 1962 when his wife Barbara was diagnosed with Multiple Sclerosis. After leaving the music business to focus on his family and his wife's care, he became a successful business owner in Cincinnati and the surrounding areas. He had several retail sewing centers where he sold and repaired sewing machines and vacuum cleaners.

== Later musical accomplishments ==
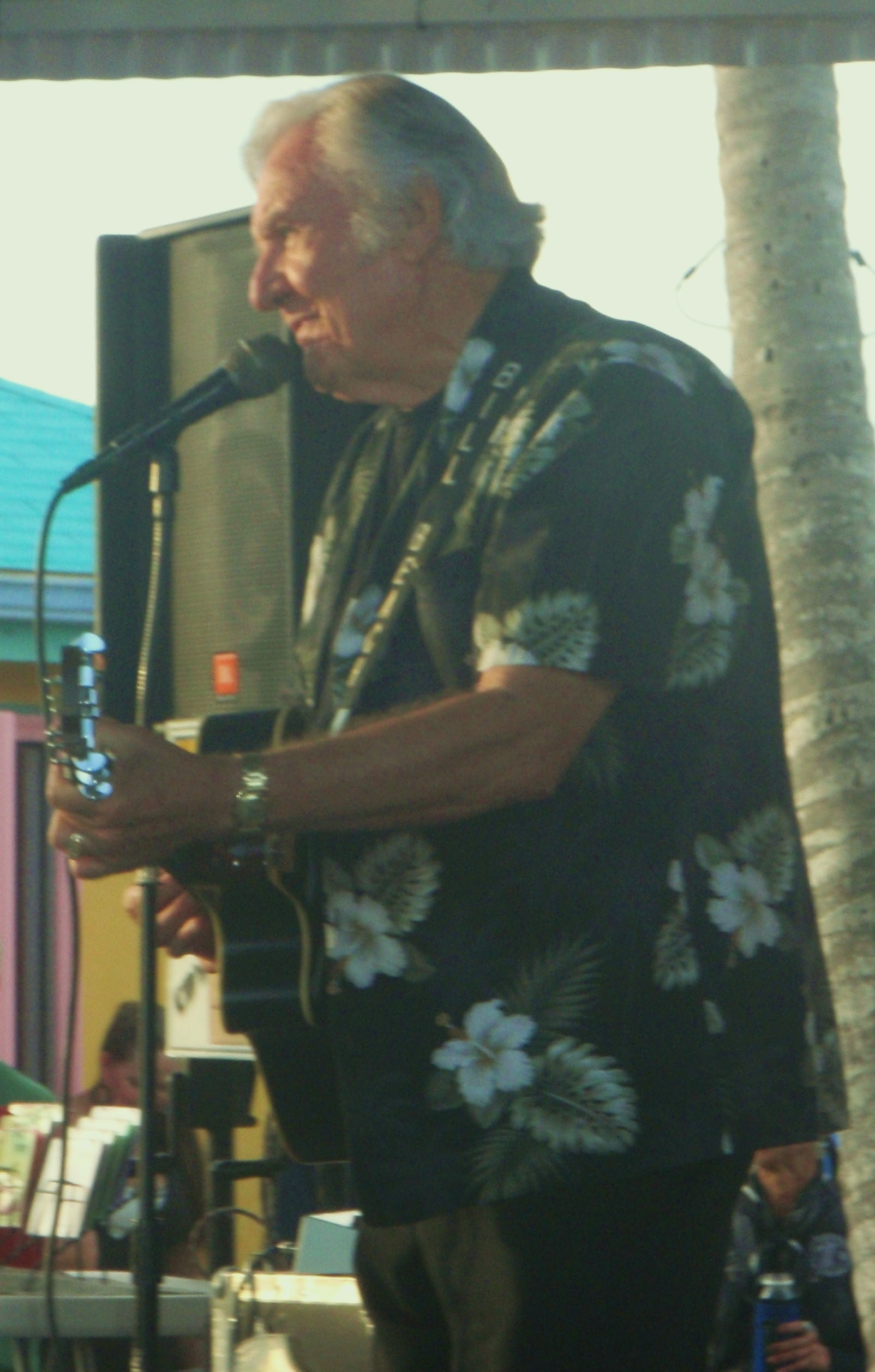
Bill "Peg Pants" Beach in 2009

In the late 1980s, during the resurgence of rockabilly in the United Kingdom and Western Europe, "Peg Pants" once again enjoyed radio success in England, France and Germany. The song has been re-released on several compilation CDs, including "King Rockabilly", a CD released in 2004 featuring successful songs from King Records and "Classic Rockabilly", a four CD box set released in 2007 highlighting Elvis Presley, Roy Orbison and other rockabilly greats from the 1950s and 1960s. Additionally, many rockabilly blogs on the internet mention his music and his music continues to be played on rockabilly-themed radio shows.

For his contribution to the American musical genre of "Rockabilly", Bill "Peg Pants" Beach was inducted into the Rockabilly Hall of Fame, headquartered in Jackson, Tennessee, US. He still writes and performs songs and has received national notoriety for some of his more recent endeavors. In 1998, he submitted his song "Viagra and the Beeper" to The Nashville Network's (TNN) International Amateur Songwriting Contest. Beach and his song placed sixth in a field of over 13,000 entrants for this upbeat, parody song. While living in the Naples, FL area, Bill "Peg Pants" Beach was a regular performer at Stan's Idle Hour, an internationally known tourist destination in Goodland, FL.

In February 1999, another song he wrote, "I Believed You Mr. President" was featured during the Cable News Network's (CNN) coverage of President Bill Clinton's impeachment trial. Also a parody and humorous song, the words of "I Believed You Mr. President" told the story of how one voter's innocence was rocked during the Monica Lewinsky scandal that ultimately led to the impeachment trial of the 42nd President of the United States of America.

In 2010, Beach was commissioned by the Rookery Bay National Estuarine Research Reserve to write a song commemorating the discovery of new aquatic wildlife in Naples, FL. He and his wife Joan split their time between Naples, Florida, and Crossville, Tennessee. They enjoyed a full retirement life. Bill continued to play music in Naples, Florida well into his eighties.

The last song Bill composed in 2021 was a tribute to his salvation through Jesus Christ. It is written with a Bluegrass flair.

Beach died in Hamilton, Ohio, on October 28, 2024, at the age of 92.

== Discography ==
| Year | Image | Title | Label |
|---|---|---|---|
| 1956 | | Peg Pants / You're Gonna Like Me Baby | King Records |

== Various artists compilations ==
- Rockabilly From Memphis (Burning Fire) released 28 October 2008 (Format: iTunes mp3)
- Classic Rockabilly (Proper UK/B000NA1TIY) released 12 Mar 2007 (Format: CD Box Set)
- Red Hot Love (Pan American Records) released 2008 (Format: CD)
- King Rockabilly (Ace/B00004WGEE) released 12 Feb 2001 (Format: CD)
- King/Federal Rockabillys (King/Gusto/K5016X) released 1978 (Format: LP)

== Later radio playlists ==
- Shakin' Katz Radio. CHRW 94.9 FM. London, ON. 15 May 2010. "Peg Pants" and "You're Gonna Like Me Baby".
- Around Cincinnati. WVXU 91.7 FM . Cincinnati, OH 28 March 2010. "Peg Pants".
- Kim Clark's Record Shack. WTZQ 1600 AM. Hendersonville, NC. 13 March 2010. "Peg Pants".
- Trevor Hyland and the Rock and Roll Dance Party. Rock-It Radio. Show No. 3284. Rock-It Radio.net/Palmsradio.com. 23 January 2010. "Peg Pants".
- Kim Clark's Record Shack. WTZQ 1600 AM. Hendersonville, NC. 28 November 2009. "Peg Pants".
- Shakin' Katz Radio. CHRW 94.9 FM. London, ON. 27 December 2008. "Peg Pants".
- Howdylicious. KUCI 88.9 FM. Irvine, CA. 4 February 2007. "Peg Pants".
- Rock and Roll Dance Party. WUSB 90.1 FM. Stony Brook, NY. 13 July 2004. "Peg Pants".
