= WVLY =

WVLY may refer to:

- WVLY (AM), a radio station (1370 AM) licensed to Moundsville, West Virginia, United States
- WVLY-FM, a radio station (100.9 FM) licensed to Milton, Pennsylvania, United States
