= Wheeling Jamboree =

American radio program

The Wheeling Jamboree was a country music radio broadcast in the United States. The Jamboree originated in 1933 in Wheeling, West Virginia on WWVA, the first radio station in West Virginia and a 50,000-watt clear-channel station AM station until about 2007. Numerous acts and stars performed on the Jamboree, some of whom would later go on to mainstream commercial success. It has long billed itself as the second-longest running country music program in the United States after the Grand Ole Opry.

In 1946, the show (then performing at the Virginia Theatre demolished in 1962) was syndicated on the CBS radio network as CBS Radio Saturday Night Country Style, becoming the first national radio broadcast from West Virginia. In 1997, WWVA dropped its country music format, although Saturday night broadcasts continued, from various theaters and managed by various entities, the final commercial one being Live Nation, initially a subsidiary of Clear Channel Communications, which had come to own WWVA. By the end of 2008, Clear Channel had restructured and became an iHeart media entity and the owners of the program (Wheeling Jamboree, Inc.) moved the broadcast to WKKX, a talk radio station with smaller coverage than WWVA, so supporters (including Brad Paisley whose career had launched on the Jamboree) created a nonprofit entity to continue the Jamboree. When Clear Channel morphed into iHeart Media in 2008, certain divestitures occurred, and the jamboree ceased weekly shows. Since 2014, the Wheeling Jamboree has broadcast from noncommercial low-power station WWOV-LP at 101.1 FM. Most recently, the Jamboree has aired quarterly live episodes (including an anniversary show, a Christmas show, and a summer show), in rotating locations; the station's online media show that live productions ceased no later than 2023.

== History ==
=== Beginnings ===
WWVA was granted a license on December 6, 1926, and its initial broadcast, via a 50-watt transmitter, was on December 13. Two-and-a-half years later, on July 1, 1929, WWVA had increased its power to 5,000 watts. Holland Engel and Howard Donahoe were among the first announcers, and in 1927, the station signed William Wallace "Bill" Jones and the Sparkling Four as its first hillbilly act. The quartet played requests made over the telephone. Jones received so many requests for yodeling songs—because of the popularity of the Blue Yodeler Jimmie Rodgers—that he was dubbed Silver Yodelin' Bill Jones. The new program director, George W. Smith, was appointed in 1931, and he quickly saw the potential of country music. Other acts such as ballad singer Fred Craddock and His Happy Five and the traditionalist Elmer Crowe joined the Jamboree. The professional trio of Cap, Andy, and Flip also signed with WWVA in 1932.

=== 1930s ===
On January 7, 1933, the Saturday night Jamboree began and three months later, on April 1, a live audience was added. The live-audience premiere of The World's Original WWVA Jamboree took place at the Capitol Theatre in Wheeling. The following years, the Jamboree broadcast from a different location each Saturday. The Sparkling Four disbanded in 1933 and Bill Jones formed the Rhythm Rogues. On November 11, 1933, Cowboy Loye (Loye Donald Pack) joined the show, and based on the amount of mail he received, became one of the biggest stars of the Jamboree. Cowboy Loye often performed together with "Just Plain" John Oldham. Four years later, in 1937, Cowboy Loye left WWVA and moved to Nebraska. He died in 1941.

Sponsored by Georgie Porgie Breakfast Foods, Hugh Cross joined the Jamboree in 1935. Cross, who was an experienced radio and recording artist, teamed up with Shug Fisher and they formed Hugh and Shug's Radio Pals. They left WWVA in 1939 for WLW in Cincinnati, Ohio. In March, 1935, announcer Murrell Poor was added to the Jamboree cast. Frankie More, who was sponsored by Pinex Cough Syrup, signed with the Jamboree in 1936. The name of Frankie More's band, the Log Cabin Gang, varied between Log Cabin Boys or Log Cabin Girls during the "Gangs" period on the show. The most prominent member of the Log Cabin Gang was the banjo player Cousin Emmy. The Log Cabin Gang left the Jamboree in 1941.

Grandpa Jones signed with the show in 1936 and joined the Rhythm Rangers, but he left the following year. He returned for a short stint in 1941 and 1945. In May 1937, Doc Williams and the Border Riders joined the program. The Border Riders became the Jamboree's most popular act of 1938. Joe Barker and the Chuck Wagon Gang came to the Jamboree in 1937. They remained favorites with the audience until 1950. In December 1937, the western singer Big Slim McAuliffe became a member of the Border Riders. In 1939, Lew Childre joined the Jamboree staying almost four years. An aspiring young star, Floyd Tillman was one of the members of Childre's group. Among other performers who passed through the Jamboree during the 1930s were the duets of Hank and Slim Newman, Chuck and Don, Handsome Bob and Happy Johnny; and the cowboy bands Slim Cox and his Flyin' X Roundup, and Tex Harrison's Texas Buckaroos.

=== 1940s ===
The concentration of female performers was larger at the WWVA Jamboree than elsewhere in the music business. Singers like Gertrude Miller, Mary "Sunflower" Calvas, Mary Ann Vestes, and Chickie Williams had a large following which increased even more at the outburst of World War II when most of the men were drafted. Some artists like Warren Caplinger, Hugh Cross, Frankie More and Slim McAuliffe had had recording experiences prior to the WWVA engagement and did fairly well. Others, like Johnny Bailes, Red Sovine, Charlie Monroe and Floyd Tillman did not. Many performers could only receive a salary if their sponsors sold any products via their shows. Rural comedy was an integral part of the Jamboree with acts such as Crazy Elmer, Shorty Godwin, Dapper Dan Martin, Smokey Pleacher, Lazy Jim Day, and Cy Sneezeweed.

On October 8, 1942, WWVA increased its power and became a 50,000-watt station. Because of the World War II, the WWVA Jamboree discontinued live-audience broadcasts between December 12, 1942 and July 13, 1946. The Jamboree, however, continued as a daytime show without a live audience. Many of the artists of the show like Doc Williams, Joe Barker, Curley Miller, Monte Blake, and Lloyd Carter got drafted and had to leave. During this period many war influenced songs were written and performed on the Jamboree: "A Hundred Million Kisses For Hitler," "The Devil and Mr Hitler," "A Letter To A Soldier," and "You Won't Know Tokyo When We Get Through." The war helped new acts on their way to the top such as the 1943 addition of Radio Rangerettes consisting of Millie Wayne and Bonnie Baldwin. In 1944, Toby Stroud's Wyoming Ranch Boys became popular. Other popular acts were Honey and Sonny (the Davis twins), and Eileen and Maxine (the Newcomer twins). Two years later, in May 1946, program director George W. Smith died but was quickly replaced by Paul Miller and William Rine.

On July 13, 1946, The World's Original WWVA Jamboree once again began its live-audience broadcast after a four-year halt. It was held at the Virginia Theatre in Wheeling and contained 13 acts. New performers had been added to the show in 1945, including the "Singing Mountaineer" Reed Dunn and the honky-tonk vocalist Hawkshaw Hawkins. Hawkins soon became the most popular star on the Jamboree. He stayed with the show until 1954 when he joined Ozark Jubilee. He was nicknamed the Hawk or Eleven Yards of Personality during his time at the show. In December 1947, Wilma Lee and Stoney Cooper signed with the Jamboree. They had previously been members of the Jamboree act the Leary Family in 1942. The Coopers left the WWVA Jamboree in 1957 to join the Grand Ole Opry. The traditional acts of Red Belcher's Kentucky Ridge Runners and the duo of Lee and Juanita Moore were added in the late 1940s. Juanita Moore left the show in 1960 and Lee Moore carried on as a solo act. More modern performers such as Don Kidwell and the actor Jimmy Walker also joined the cast in 1949. Although Kidwell left the show in 1953, Walker continued on and off until 1964. The gospel quartet of the Sunshine Boys became part of the Jamboree in 1949 and they remained there for two years. The "Yodelin' Ranger" Hank Snow and the Colorado singing cowboy Ken Curtis joined the Jamboree in the late 1940s as two separate acts. Snow and Curtis left within a year and Curtis went on to become a successful Hollywood actor. The country music writer and musician George Morgan also worked at the Jamboree for a few months before leaving for Grand Ole Opry.

=== 1950s ===
In 1951, the Country Harmony Boys, the first country band to have a union contract joined the WWVA Jamboree. They worked as a staff band meaning they worked with anybody on the show that could use them. The majority of the cast at the Jamboree did not make recordings, but those who did include Hawkshaw Hawkins, Wilma Lee & Stoney Cooper, Big Slim McAuliffe, Red Belcher, the Lilly Brothers, Gay Schwing, Lee & Juanita Moore, the Ritchie Brothers, Roy Scott, and the Radio Rangerettes. Doc Williams even founded his own record company, Wheeling Records. In 1953, the honky-tonk vocalist Sidney "Hardrock" Gunter came to the show. He later branched out on his own recording rockabilly for Sun Records. During the 1950s, recorded music gradually replaced live performances and Hardrock Gunter and Lee Moore became the station's deejays. Married couples who performed at the Jamboree became increasingly popular such as Joe & Shirley Barker, Lee & Juanita Moore, Doc & Chickie Williams, and Wilma Lee & Stoney Cooper. In April 1952, bluegrass music made its entry at the Jamboree when the Bailey Brothers and Their Happy Valley Boys were signed. The Bailey Brothers left the show in 1954 when Dan Bailey became ill and returned to Tennessee.

The bluegrass duo of Jim & Jesse McReynolds and Hylo Brown had a short stint at the Jamboree during the summer months of 1955. In October 1956, the Osborne Brothers joined the Jamboree. They had previously been on the show, between August and December 1955, as part of Charlie Bailey's Band. The Osbornes left the show and moved to the Grand Ole Opry in 1963. As the fame of Elvis Presley began to increase, a similar decrease in honky-tonk and traditional styles began to take its toll among the members of the Jamboree and many were forced to leave. During this period rockabilly became a regular feature at the show with artists like Bob Gallion, Hardrock Gunter and Chuck & Jim Cook. All had joined earlier as straight country singers. The Jamboree managed to survive the explosion of rock 'n roll through a mix of rockabilly and traditional music.

=== 1960s and 70s ===
In July 1962, the Virginia Theatre in Wheeling was demolished. It had been the home of The World's Original WWVA Jamboree since July 1946. The Rex Theatre became the new locale for the live-audience Jamboree. WWVA-AM changed ownership in the mid-1960s and a new program director was appointed in August 1965, Lee Sutton. Plans arose to cancel the Jamboree but Doc Williams and John Corrigan wanted to revitalize the show instead. The Jamboree added 27 new acts within the next 15 months, including country and bluegrass music acts such as David Houston, Esco Hankins and the Stanley Brothers. On November 8, 1965, the new program director, Arlen Sanders, made WWVA a "full-time country radio station" and on January 15, 1966, the Jamboree moved to a new location at Wheeling Island Exhibition Hall. In May 1966, Mac Wiseman was hired to work both as a performer and a talent agent. He started a new radio program in October, the Mac Wiseman Record Shop, which aired at midnight following the Jamboree. Wiseman would continue to direct the Jamboree until his departure in 1970. The deejay, Lee Moore, went on the air with a new program on November 1, 1966, The All Night Show. Lee Moore eventually left the show in 1973 as he became increasingly tired of being a "button-pusher".

On December 13, 1969, the WWVA Jamboree moved its live-audience shows back to the same Capitol Theatre used for the 1933 broadcasts. The Capitol Theatre had been purchased in the summer of 1969 by Communications Inc. and had its name changed to Capitol Music Hall. The Jamboree changed its name as well to the more cosmopolitan sounding Jamboree U.S.A. Special guest stars such as Buck Owens, Ray Price, Charlie Pride and Tammy Wynette, who weren't part of the regular cast, began to appear, and the regular artists were overshadowed. Despite the new format, Doc Williams continued to perform at the Jamboree well into the 1980s. Rockabilly singer Bob Gallion began to sing country duets with Patti Powell in the 1970s. The yodeler Kenny Roberts left the Jamboree in 1973 after a 14-year stint.

A new roster of country music stars were tied to the Jamboree during the 1960s and 1970s including Freddy Carr, Jimmie Stephens, Darnell Miller, Junior Norman, Kenny Biggs, Gus Thomas, Slim Lehart, and Bud Cutright. Also bluegrass groups like Jimmy Martin and the Sunny Mountain Boys, Charlie Moore & Bill Napier, Red Smiley and His Bluegrass Cutups, Tater Tate and the Shenadoah Cutups, and Frank Necessary and the Stone Mountain Boys became more common at the Jamboree. Even gospel groups like the Blue Ridge Quartet—who became the most popular act of 1970—and Walter Bailes Singers were regulars at the show. In the early 1970s, "Trucker's Jamborees" were held at the Jamboree with performers such as Dick Curless, Dave Dudley, and Patti Powell. Homecoming reunions were arranged where the old-timers of yesterday like Bill Jones, Elmer Crowe, Doc Williams, and Grandpa Jones could gather. It is estimated that between 1933 and 1976, more than five million visitors attended The World's Original WWVA Jamboree.

During the entire decade of the 1970s, former Country Music bandleader Glenn Reeves was the Executive Director and General manager of the show. Reeves' tenure lasted until 1982. Freddy Carr, Jerry Brightman, Gus Thomas, and Jim Sutton were included on his management team which launched the annual summer Country Music Festival, "Jamboree in the Hills" at nearby St. Clairsville, Ohio. This multi-day annual festival still continued through 2018. Live Nation decided to not have the festival again in 2019 due to their desire to change the festivals concession policies which permitted patrons to bring in their own coolers and contents as opposed to having to purchase concessions inside the venue. They called it a hiatus to allow the fans and Live Nation to consider bringing the festival back in 2020 (something that would have been impossible due to social distancing mandates imposed during the COVID-19 pandemic) with much different concession policies as well as some other traditional policies that Live Nation desired to change in the past but met with angry fans promising to boycott the festival if Live Nation changed the policies. To the last performance on the stage in 2018 it was one of America's major American Country Music festivals, featuring top-name stars on its headliners' list every year. (The Jamboree in the Hills was later spun off to Live Nation in 2006; WWVA owner iHeartMedia also continued to air the annual event on WOVK.) until the last performance in 2018.

The song "Take Me Home, Country Roads," a major hit for John Denver, was inspired by the Jamboree. Written by two songwriters who had never been to the state, they lived in Massachusetts but thought that state was not particularly lyrical, so having heard the Jamboree on the radio and noting that "West Virginia" had the same syllabic rhythm, they made the song about West Virginia instead. The line in the song mentioning "radio reminds me of my home far away" is a subtle reference to the Jamboree. Eventually the song became the official song of the state of West Virginia. Recording Artist / Jamboree USA Performer Freddy Carr was contracted by the Tourist Development Division of the West Virginia Chamber of Commerce to represent the state at numerous special banquets, concerts and sporting events throughout the U.S. and Canada. His signature rendition of "Take Me Home Country Roads" became a staple live performance at many promotional events during the 1970s.

Lou Christie was a professed fan of the program, and cited it as an inspiration for his brief shift into country music in the early 1970s.

=== 1980s ===
In the mid 80s a young Brad Paisley, a native of nearby Glen Dale first appeared on the Wheeling Jamboree. He became a regular member, until he moved to Nashville, Tennessee in 1997 to complete his formal education.

=== 1990s ===
Though WWVA dropped its country music format in 1997, it continued to carry the Jamboree on Saturday nights. The station's ownership would change hands several times during this period; Atlantic Star Communications would sell the group to Chancellor/AMFM Inc. which would ultimately merge into Clear Channel Communications (now iHeartMedia). The Capitol Music Hall and the Jamboree would also be managed by Clear Channel's concert promotion division, Live Nation.

=== 21st century ===
WWVA's corporate owners elected to hire production entities to manage the weekly stage production of the show, eventually leading to operations of the show by Live Nation. The transition to the non-profit and current unit of the Wheeling Jamboree took place between 2006 & 2007 through today. WWVA dropped the program in the late 2000s (part of a broader restructuring at Clear Channel that saw the spin-off of Live Nation, which continued to own the Jamboree in the Hills until its 2019 shutdown), and for the next several years, Jamboree broadcasts were carried on WKKX, another talk radio station, which also syndicated the show in an effort to make up WKKX's somewhat smaller coverage area.

The nonprofit Wheeling Jamboree established WWOV-LP in 2014. Licensed to Martins Ferry, Ohio at only 6 watts of effective radiated power from a tower in Brookside, Ohio, the station covers most of Wheeling and a few of the city's suburbs.

Live Nation eventually divested the Capitol Music Hall to the Wheeling/Ohio County Convention and Visitors Bureau, which completed renovations to the theater in 2019; by the time that theater reopened, heavy demand from national promoters prevented the Jamboree from returning to the theater permanently. The last new program mentioned on any Jamboree media was the 89th anniversary show, which was previewed on the program's YouTube channel; the program Web site read "next show to be announced" for roughly two years after the 90th anniversary show in 2023. In 2025, the Jamboree announced its next show would be an outdoor concert with festival seating, akin to the former Jamboree in the Hills, at The Highlands in Triadelphia. The announcement was part of a permanent relocation to The Highlands for the organization.

== The Goodwill Tours ==
In April 1939, the Jamboree went on its first package tour which comprised two solo performers and seven bands led by the announcer Bill Thomas. They visited three towns in Pennsylvania and three towns in Ohio. The first Goodwill Tour was a success and thus, a new Goodwill Tour was arranged each year.

The First Goodwill Tour of 1939 consisted of Big Slim McAuliffe, Elmer Crowe, Doc Williams' Border Riders, Fincher's Cotton Pickers, Frankie More's Log Cabin Girls, Joe Barker's Radio Cirkus, Hugh & Shug's Radio Pals, Jake Taylor's Railsplitters and the Tommy Nelson Gang.

The Second Goodwill Tour of 1940 consisted of Bill Jones, Big Slim McAuliffe, the Border Riders, Fincher's Cotton Pickers, the Log Cabin Girls, the Radio Cirkus, the Tommy Nelson Gang, Pete Cassell, Mack Jeffers, Curley Miller and Blaine Smith.

The Third Goodwill Tour of 1941 consisted of Bill Jones, Big Slim's Happy Ranch Gang, Lew Childre and His Buckeyes, Chief Redhawk, the Chuck Wagon Doughboys, the Log Cabin Boys, Brown Eyes, Benny Kissinger and Smiley Sutter.

The Fourth Goodwill Tour of 1942 consisted of Bill Jones, Big Slim McAuliffe, the Border Riders, Lew Childre, the Leary Family, Curley Miller, the blind twins Eileen and Maxine, Smiley Sutter and Millie Wayne.

== Jamboree venue timeline ==
Years	Venue	Description
January 7, 1933	Hawley Building WWVA studios	Gave start to WWVA Midnight Jamboree; now known as Mull Center Building
April 1, 1933	Capitol Theatre	First Stage Presentation of The WWVA Jamboree from the Capitol Theatre.
February 1934	Victoria Theatre	Show moved here for short run: West Virginia's oldest theater.
1935–1945	Market Auditorium	Demolished 1964
1946–1962	Virginia Theatre	Jamboree came to National Prominence and syndicated on CBS Radio Saturday Night Country Style. First national broadcast from West Virginia - demolished 1962.
1962–1965	Rex Theater (also briefly known as Coronet Theater)	Demolished 1970s.
1966–1969	Wheeling Island Exhibition Hall	Currently owned by Wheeling Island Gaming, Inc./ Delaware North; not in use.
1969–2005	Capitol Theatre	This period included the Jamboree USA years. Theater name was reverted from Capitol Music Hall back to the Capitol Theatre. Deed of the Capitol Theatre became property of Live Nation in the divestiture between Clear Channel Entertainment and Live Nation in post closure years of the theatre.
2006–2007	Wheeling Jamboree Non-Profit Corp Formation	Immediately after Belkin Entertain / Live Nation ceased the stage productions of the Jamboree the Non-Profit Corp. with the assistance of the Brad Paisley Foundation and Board Member Doug Paisley in cooperation with WWVA Radio resumed archive broadcasts and began live stage productions from other Wheeling area auditoriums.
2008	Live Broadcasts remain on WWVA	Broadcasts Productions held at Wesbanco Arena, John Marshall High School, Brush Run Park and WV Business College Classroom / Studio. WWVA ends broadcasts of the Wheeling Jamboree as result of formation of iHeart Media.
2009	Live Broadcasts continue	Shows move to Victoria Theatre for the first time since 1934. Broadcast in agreement with WKKX AM-1600
2010	Live Broadcasts continue	Shows move to River City Center, 4th St. Methodist Building, Capitol Theatre Ballroom and 77th Anniversary held April on the main stage of the Capitol Theatre.
2011–2012	Strand Theatre	Located in Moundsville, West Virginia.
2012–2014	Wheeling Island Hotel & Casino	Located at the Southern end of Wheeling Island in Wheeling, West Virginia.
2015-2019	Capitol Theatre	The Wheeling Jamboree now hold quarterly broadcast stage shows again from the renovated Capitol Theatre now on WWOV FM

== WWVA Wheeling Jamboree acts by year ==
The acts and performers of the WWVA Jamboree and years they were added to the show:

=== 1927 ===
- Silver Yodelin' Bill Jones and the Sparkling Four

=== 1929 ===
- Fred Craddock's Happy Five (Fred Craddock, Gay Schwing + more)

=== 1932 ===
- Cap, Andy and Flip (Warren Caplinger, Andy Patterson, William Strickland)
- Elmer Crowe
- The Tweedy Brothers

=== 1933 ===
- Bill Jones and the Rhythm Rogues (Bill Jones, Fred Gardini, Blaine Heck, Paul Myers)
- Just Plain John Oldham
- Loye Donald "Cowboy Loye" Pack

=== 1934 ===
- Chuck and Don
- Hank and Slim Newman
- Peruna Panhandle Rangers

=== 1935 ===
- Handsome Bob Bouch & Happy Johnny Zufall
- Hugh and Shug's Radio Pals (Hugh Cross, Shug Fisher, Mary Ann Vestes)
- The Rhythm Rangers (Loren Bledsoe, Harold "Pete" Rensler, Mary Ann Estes)
- Roy Freeman
- Slim Carter
- Slim Cox and his Flyin' X Roundup (Mel Cox, Red Kidwell, Hal Harris)
- Tex Harrison's Texas Buckaroos (Tex Harrison, French Mitchell, Auvil Mitchell)

=== 1936 ===
- Frankie More's Log Cabin Gang
- Frankie More's Log Cabin Boys (Frankie More, Fiddlin Dale Cole, Dolph Hewitt)
- Frankie More's Log Cabin Girls (Frankie More, Alma Crosby, Cousin Emmy, Rhoda Jones, Penny Woodford, Celia Mauri)
- Grandpa Jones
- Jake Taylor and His Railsplitters (Jake Taylor, Betty Taylor, Ray "Quarantine" Brown, Herman Redmon)

=== 1937 ===
- Doc Williams and His Border Riders (Doc Williams, Curley Sims, Cy Smik, Mary Calvas, Hamilton Fincher, Big Slim McAuliffe)
- Big Slim McAuliffe
- Joe Barker's Chuck Wagon Gang
- The Singing Sailors (Red Sovine, Johnnie Bailes)

=== 1938 ===
- Charlie Monroe and His Kentucky Pardners

=== 1939 ===
- Honey and Sonny (Maxine Davis, Nial Davis)
- Joe Barker's Radio Cirkus
- Lew Childre's Band (Lew Childre, Floyd Tillman + more)
- Millie Wayne
- Tommy Nelson Gang (Tommy Nelson, Nial Davis, Maxine Davis)

=== 1940 ===
- Blaine Smith
- Calvin "Curley" Miller
- Mack Jeffers and His Fiddlin' Farmers (Mack Jeffers, Celia Mauri)
- Pete Cassell
- The Davis Twins, Honey and Sonny

=== 1941 ===
- Anthony Slater "Smiley Sutter"/"Crazy Elmer"
- Benny Kissinger
- Big Slim's Happy Ranch Gang
- Chuck Wagon Doughboys
- Lew Childre and His Buckeyes
- Chief Redhawk

=== 1942 ===
- Eileen and Maxine Newcomer
- The Leary Family (Wilma Lee & Stoney Cooper + more)
- The Saylor Sisters (Wanda, Jeanie and Linda)

=== 1943 ===
- Radio Rangerettes (Millie Wayne, Ruth "Bonnie" Baldwin)

=== 1944 ===
- Toby Stroud's Wyoming Ranch Boys (Toby Stroud, Buck Ryan, Bill Bailey)
- Toby Stroud's Blue Mountain Boys

=== 1945 ===
- Gay Schwing and His Gang From the Hills (Gay Schwing, Herman Schwing, Ramona Schwing)
- Hawkshaw Hawkins
- Reed "The Singing Mountaineer" Dunn

=== 1946 ===
- Shorty Fincher's Prairie Pals

=== 1947 ===
- Wilma Lee & Stoney Cooper and the Clinch Mountain Clan
- Marie 'Pat' Johnson & Dan Johnson The Singing Buckeye's. and the Rhythm Rangers and the

=== 1948 ===
- Red Belcher's Kentucky Ridge Runners
- Bill "Peg Pants" Beach
- The Lilly Brothers
- George Morgan
- Ken Curtis

=== 1949 ===
- Don Kidwell
- Hank Snow
- Lee Moore & Juanita Moore
- The Sunshine Boys (Fred Daniel, Ace Richman, J. D. Sumner, Eddie Wallace)

=== 1951 ===
- Country Harmony Boys (Roy Scott, Gene Jenkins, Monte Blake, James Carson, Will Carver, Bill Chamberlain)
- Dusty Owens

=== 1952 ===
- The Bailey Brothers and Their Happy Valley Boys (Charles Bailey, Dan Bailey, Don McHan, Joe Stuart, Clarence "Tater" Tate, Jake Tullock)
- Bob Gallion
- Gene Hooper
- Skeeter Bonn

=== 1953 ===
- Cowboy Phil's Golden West Girls (Philip Reed, Gay Franzi, Tina Franzi, Abbie Neal, Wanda Saylor)
- Lone Pine & Betty Cody

=== 1954 ===
- Bud Messner and His Skyline Boys
- Buddy & Marion Durham
- Mabelle Seiger and Her Sons of the Plains (Mabelle Seiger, Curly Seiger, Chuck Cook, Jim Cook)

=== 1955 ===
- Charlie Bailey's Band (Charlie Bailey, Bobby Osborne, Sonny Osborne + more)
- Jim & Jesse McReynolds
- Hylo Brown and His Buckskin Boys
- Osborne Brothers (Bobby Osborne, Sonny Osborne, Red Allen, Ernie Newton)

=== 1956 ===
- Kathy Dee

Abbie Neal and the Ranch Girls

Sunshine Boys

Rusty and Doug Kerahaw

Donna Darlene

=== 1957 ===
- Donn Reynolds

=== 1959 ===
- Kenny Roberts

in 1960 the vandergrift brothers, darrell, don, and ronnie joined the jamboree. they were regulars for several years, and recorded for king records.

=== 1962 ===
- Country Gentlemen

Lois Johnson

Kirk Hansard

Louella Perkins

Bonnie Baldwin

=== 1963 ===
- Jimmie Stephens

=== 1964 ===
- Charlie Moore & Bill Napier

=== 1965 ===
- Cousin Wilbur Wesbrooks
- Esco Hankins
- David Houston
- Jim Greer's Mac-O-Chee Valley Folks
- Red Smiley and His Bluegrass Cutups
- Stanley Brothers
- Mary Lou Turner
- Roger And Don Hoard / The Harmonizers

=== 1966 ===
- Darnell Miller
- Mac Wiseman

=== 1969 ===
- Beverly Heckel
- Tater Tate and the Shenandoah Cutups

=== 1970 ===
- Stan Jr.
- Junior Norman
- Freddy Carr
- Patti Powell
- Kay Kemmer
- Gus and Jo Ann Thomas
- Jerry Brightman
- Slim Lehart
- Buddy Ray
- Penny DeHaven
- Johnny Dollar
- Compton Brothers
- Skinney Clark
- Kenny Biggs
- Elton Britt
- Bud Cutright
- Lynn Stewart
- Holly Garrett
- Doty Lynn
- Roger Hoard
- John LeMaster
- The Heckles
- Crazy Elmer
- Denny Franks
- Donnie Hoard

=== 1971 ===
- Rick Erickson
- The Heckels
- Beth Moore
- Dick Curliss
- Les Seevers
- Joe Pain
- George Elliott
- Buddy Griffin
- Mayf Nutter
- Bob Wood
- Frank Necessary and The Stone Mountain Boys
- Ray Kirkland
- David Smith
- Johnny Russell
- Doc and Chickie Williams
- Dave Dudley
- Blue Ridge
- Kay Kemmer
- Jerry Taylor
- Van Trevor
- Linda Kay Lance
- Margo Smith
- Jo Ann Davis

=== 1972 ===
- Patty Joy

=== 1973 ===
- Karen McKinzie
- Steve Mazure
- Walter Bailes Singers (Frankie Bailes, Dorothy Jo Hope + more)
- Greg Steele
