= Centre Market =

- U.S. National Register of Historic Places
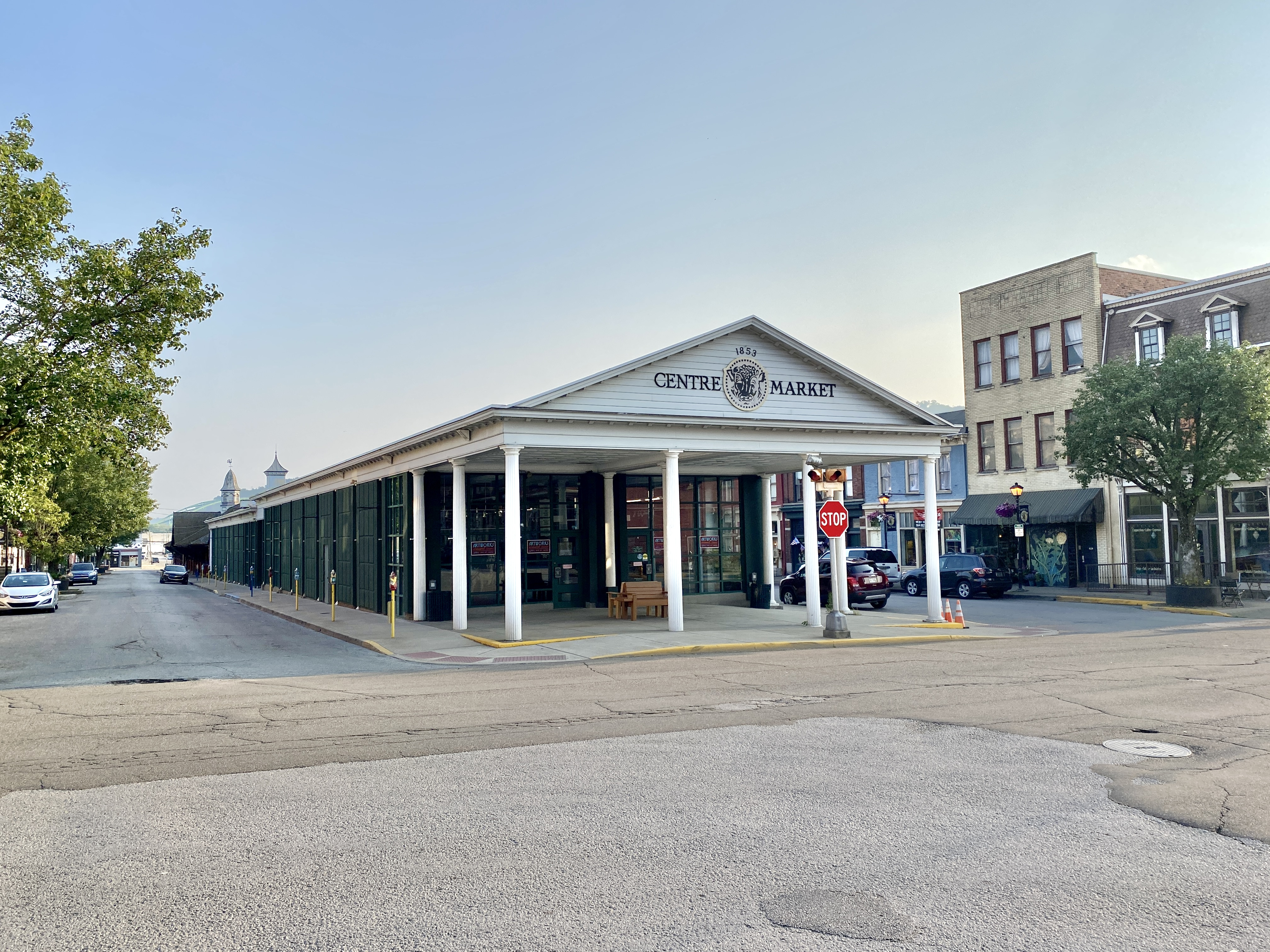
- Upper Market House, Centre Market

- Location within West Virginia Location within the United States
- Location: Market St. between 22nd and 23rd Sts., Wheeling, West Virginia
- Coordinates: 40°3′32″N 80°43′27″W
- Area: 0.6 acres (0.24 ha)
- Built: 1853; 173 years ago
- Architect: Pope, Thomas; Franzheim, Edward B.
- Architectural style: Romanesque, Neo-Classical
- NRHP reference No.: 75001896
- Added to NRHP: February 20, 1975

The Centre Market is a historic public market located along Market Street between 22nd and 23rd Streets in Wheeling, West Virginia. It consists of the Centre Wheeling Market building (Upper Market House) as well as the Centre Wheeling Fish Market (Lower Market House). It was listed on the National Register of Historic Places for Ohio County on February 20, 1975. The property is also located in the Centre Market Square Historic District.

The 1853 Centre Market building was designed by architect Thomas Pope as an open market. The building is of neo-classical style with three bays and structural cast iron Doric order columns. It has a gable roof and features a belfry complete with bell. The 1890 open brick, neo-Romanesque section was designed by Wheeling architect Edward B. Franzheim. It has brick piers that support a hipped roof with cross gables and a three-foot overhang. In 1900, a wooden enclosure was built at the northern bay to house the Centre Fish Market.

== Gallery ==
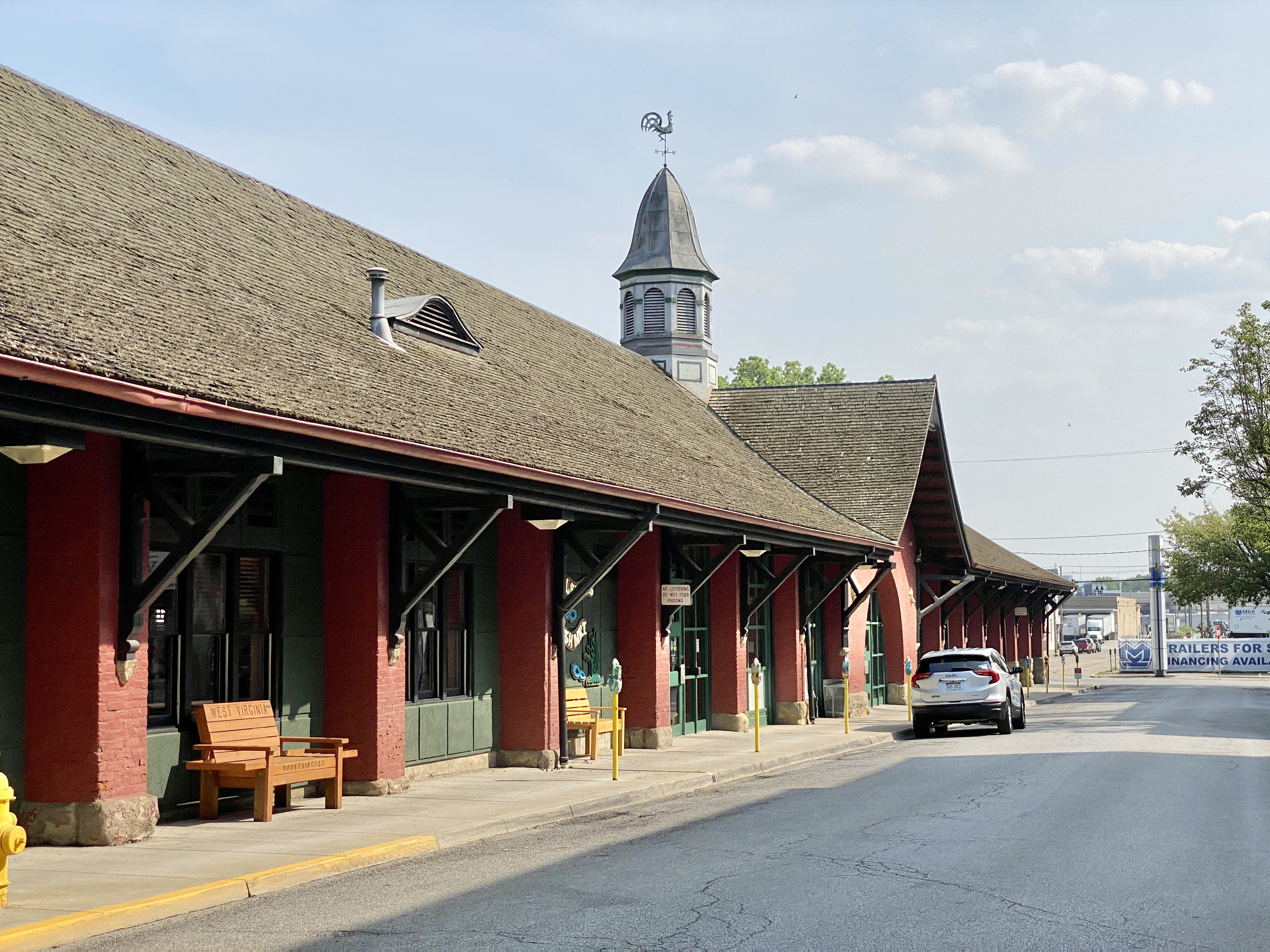
Lower Market House

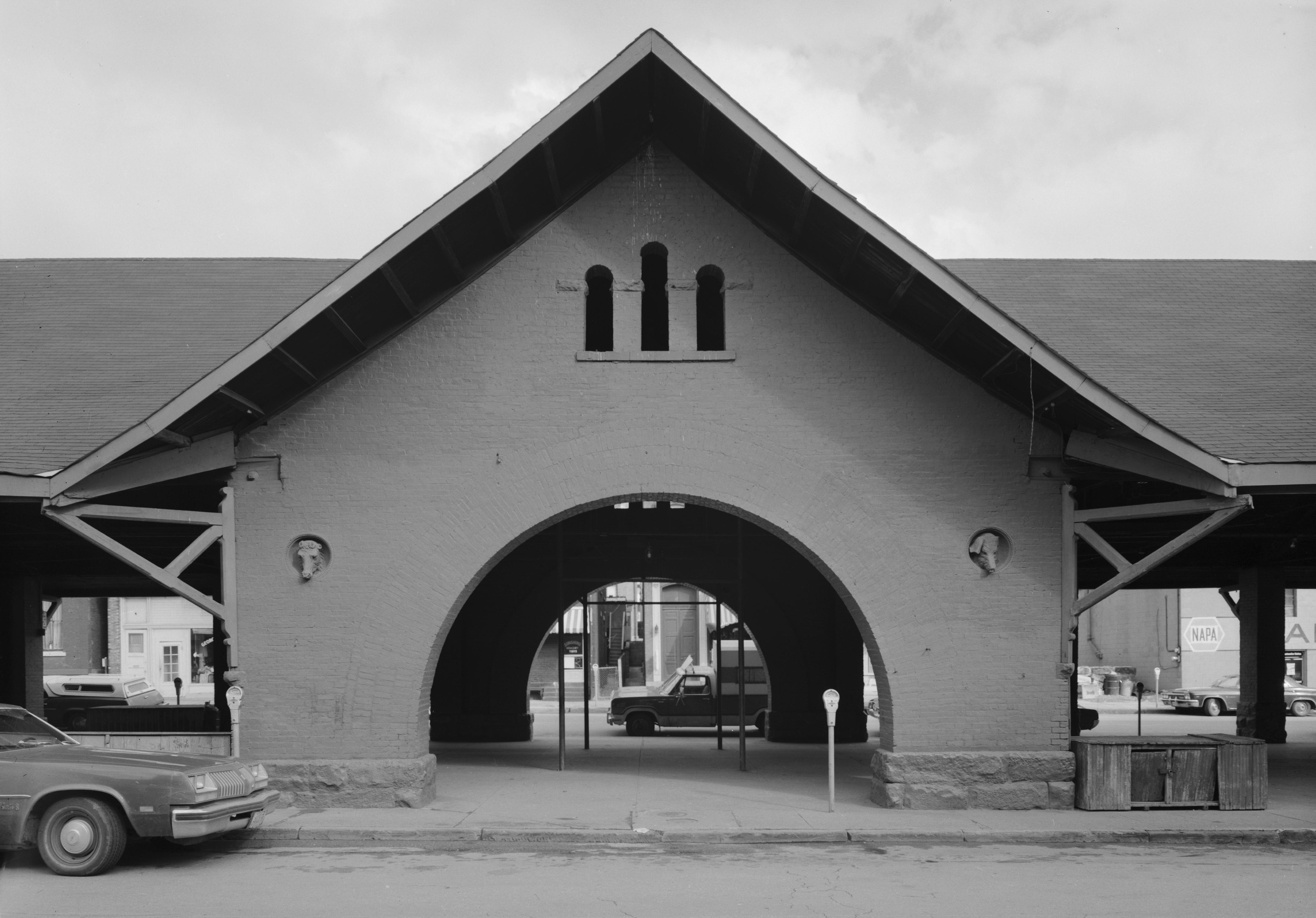
Centre Wheeling Fish Market in 1977
