= WWOV-LP =

- Martins Ferry, Ohio; United States
- Broadcast area: Bridgeport, Ohio; Wheeling, West Virginia
- Frequency: 101.1 MHz
- Branding: 101.1 WWOV

Programming
- Format: Americana

Ownership
- Owner: Wheeling Jamboree, Inc.

History
- First air date: October 23, 2014
- Call sign meaning: Wheeling, West Virginia and the Ohio Valley

Technical information
- Licensing authority: FCC
- Facility ID: 195531
- Class: L1
- Power: 6 Watts
- HAAT: 116.1 meters (381 ft)
- Transmitter coordinates: 40°3′15.0″N 80°45′34.0″W

Links
- Public license information: LMS
- Webcast: WWOV-LP Webstream
- Website: WWOV-LP Online

WWOV-LP is an Americana formatted broadcast radio station licensed to Martins Ferry, Ohio, serving Bridgeport, Ohio and Wheeling, West Virginia. WWOV-LP is owned and operated by Wheeling Jamboree, Inc. Its format includes classic country, country gospel, Southern gospel, and bluegrass.
