= Capitol Theatre (Wheeling, West Virginia) =

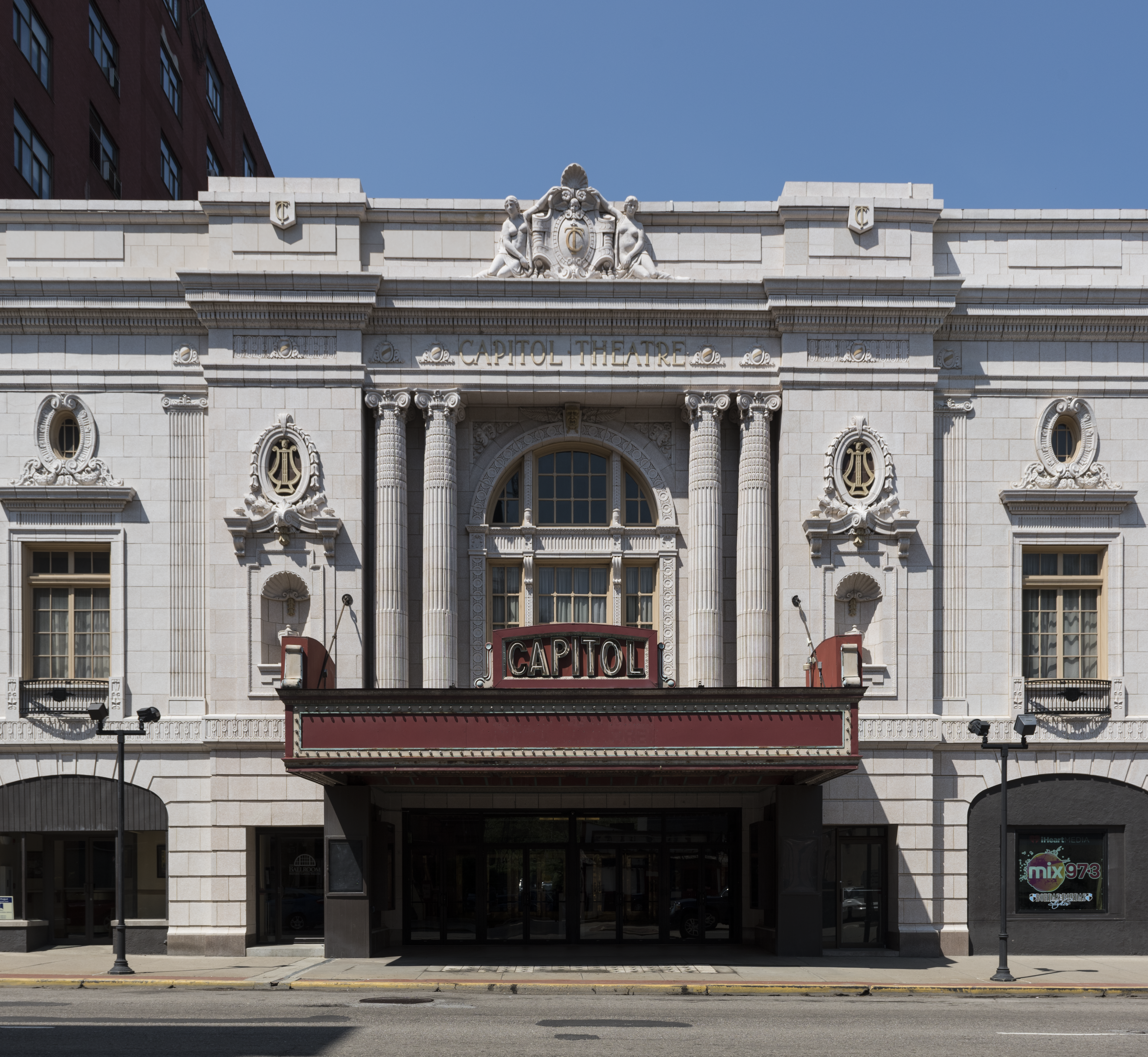
- Interactive map of the Capitol Theatre area
- Former names: Capitol Music Hall

General information
- Type: Theatre
- Location: Wheeling, West Virginia, United States, 1015 Main Street
- Coordinates: 40.07006°N 80.72442°W

Design and construction
- Architect: Charles W. Bates

The Capitol Theatre (formerly the Capitol Music Hall) is the largest theatre in West Virginia and a landmark building in the national historic district of downtown Wheeling. For many years, it has served as the home of Jamboree USA and the Wheeling Symphony Orchestra. Jamboree USA, a Saturday night live country music show broadcast on WWVA 1170 AM from 1926 until 2007, was the second-longest running radio show in the United States, second only to the Grand Ole Opry. The live music show annually drew hundreds of thousands of country music fans to Wheeling, where both local acts and nationally known celebrities such as Johnny Cash, Loretta Lynn, Merle Haggard and Charley Pride would perform.

== History ==
The Capitol Theatre, designed by architect Charles W. Bates of Wheeling, was built by general contractor R. R. Kitchen at a cost of $1,000,000 and first opened on Thanksgiving day 1928. The theater initially presented movies and stage shows and later concerts by the Wheeling Symphony Society, which moved into the building in 1929. The radio station WWVA staged its first Jamboree show production at the Capitol in 1933. However, the Jamboree moved the venue to the Victoria Theatre after a year at the Capitol and the symphony followed thereafter, feeling that showing movies detracted from the musical performance. After the theater stopped showing movies, the symphony returned to the Capitol in 1961, followed years later in 1969 by the Jamboree, which had tried several different venues since the Capitol, the longest venue being the Virginia Theater. In the subsequent years, the Capitol experienced major success as the Capitol Music Hall. In 1969, WWVA moved its studio to the Capitol building, where it produced and broadcast its Jamboree music shows. The Jamboree, the show later recast as Jamboree USA, and the theater was renamed the Capitol Music Hall; it experienced major success and drew supporters from throughout the tri-state area.

In 2006, Clear Channel, which purchased WWVA and had cut the station's budget and locally originated programming to its corporate minimum (and even attempted an unsuccessful city of license move to the Akron market in 2004), ended the series to carry more syndicated programming, and later closed the theater after the building failed an annual safety inspection in the spring of 2007 and was assessed with a list of fire code violations. In addition to the theater, the Capitol Building included a ballroom, shop and recording studio, and also housed Clear Channel's other five radio stations in the region (including WWVA) which continued to use the building after the theater was closed. The Wheeling Symphony has also been playing in various other venues during this time. To address the code requirements, it was estimated that the building needed a minimum of two million dollars in repairs and renovation. As part of the spin-off of its concert business into Live Nation in 2005, Clear Channel also sold off the theater to Live Nation; Live Nation itself put the building up for sale for $850,000 in May 2007. On February 5, 2009, the Wheeling Convention and Visitors Bureau (CVB) announced that it would purchase the then-Capitol Music Hall from Live Nation at a cost of $615,000. The purchase was finalized on April 3, 2009.

== Restoration ==
In early 2009, after the 81-year-old, 2,400-seat theater had been closed for nearly two years, a group of local organizations partnered together and purchased the theater from concert promoter Live Nation for $615,000. Initially, the Ohio Valley Area Development Corporation will take the title of the property. The coalition of local groups, which includes the Wheeling-Ohio County Convention and Visitors Bureau, Wheeling National Heritage Area Corporation, Regional Economic Development Partnership and the City of Wheeling, has undertaken to raise $8 million to restore the building, which is seen as a central piece of revitalizing the downtown entertainment district. The Greater Wheeling Sports and Entertainment Authority, which now operates the theater, has seen tremendous success in its first year of operation. Numerous shows have played to sold-out crowds over its first eight months since its re-opening. By the end of 2010, theater will offer new expanded concessions and lounge area (mid-May 2010), new larger handicap-accessible restrooms (mid-May 2010) an elevator, and a remodeled ballroom. The newly remodeled ballroom will be easily accessible by the new elevator and will be open before many events as a restaurant. This area will also be available for rentals for receptions. This area may also feature smaller concerts, dances, and comedy acts. In June 2019, the theatre's mortgage through Community Bank was retired. The Wheeling/Ohio County Convention and Visitors Bureau under the direction of Frank O'Brien satisfied loans for the theatre's purchase and safety upgrades. The CVB is the sole owner of the theatre and has an operating agreement with the city's of Wheeling's Sports and Entertainment Authority. An average of 52-thousand patrons attend concerts, shows and special community activities each year at the historic theatre generating an estimated positive economic impact between $3 and $5-million per year.
