= Flag of Wheeling, West Virginia =

The flag of Wheeling, West Virginia is the banner representing the city of Wheeling, West Virginia. As part of the city's 250th anniversary in 2018, the flag was adopted, replacing the former city banner adopted in 1968.

In a 2022 survey conducted by the North American Vexillological Association, it was named the seventh best American city flag.

== History ==
Former flag of Wheeling from 1968 to 2018

The former banner of the city originated from a contest held by the Wheeling Elks Lodge 28 in 1964. The winning design was submitted by Mr. and Mrs. Robert Emblem. It was first unveiled that same year, at Oglebay Park. However, in spite of this unveiling, the banner was not officially adopted by city council in 1988. Despite the official adoption of the banner, it went largely unnoticed. On the top left is Fort Henry — a military siege formerly located in the city — and the bottom right is the present state of the city. The arrow in the middle represented forward movement. The current flag was adopted in 2018, ahead of Wheeling's 250th anniversary celebrations. The flag was created by the Wheeling 250 Committee and adopted on September 4th. Since then, the flag has garnered an ''A'' grade out of 312 flags from the North American Vexillological Association, being one of 25 banners to do so.

== Design ==
The flag is composed of three bars, two blue and one white in the middle. These bars represents the three modes of transportation which built Wheeling: river, road and rail. In the white bar, there are five stars. The first star represents the Indigenous people who designated Wheeling's name. The second star represents the settlement of the Zane brothers in the area, Fort Henry and its 1777 and 1782 sieges. The third star, similarly to the bars, evokes the modes of transportation — river, road and rail — who built Wheeling. The fourth star symbolizes the involvement of the city in the American Civil War. The fifth and last star evokes Wheeling as a manufacturing hub. The eight-point stars symbolizes navigation stars.
