= Centre Market Square Historic District =

Historic district in West Virginia, United States

- U.S. National Register of Historic Places
- U.S. Historic district
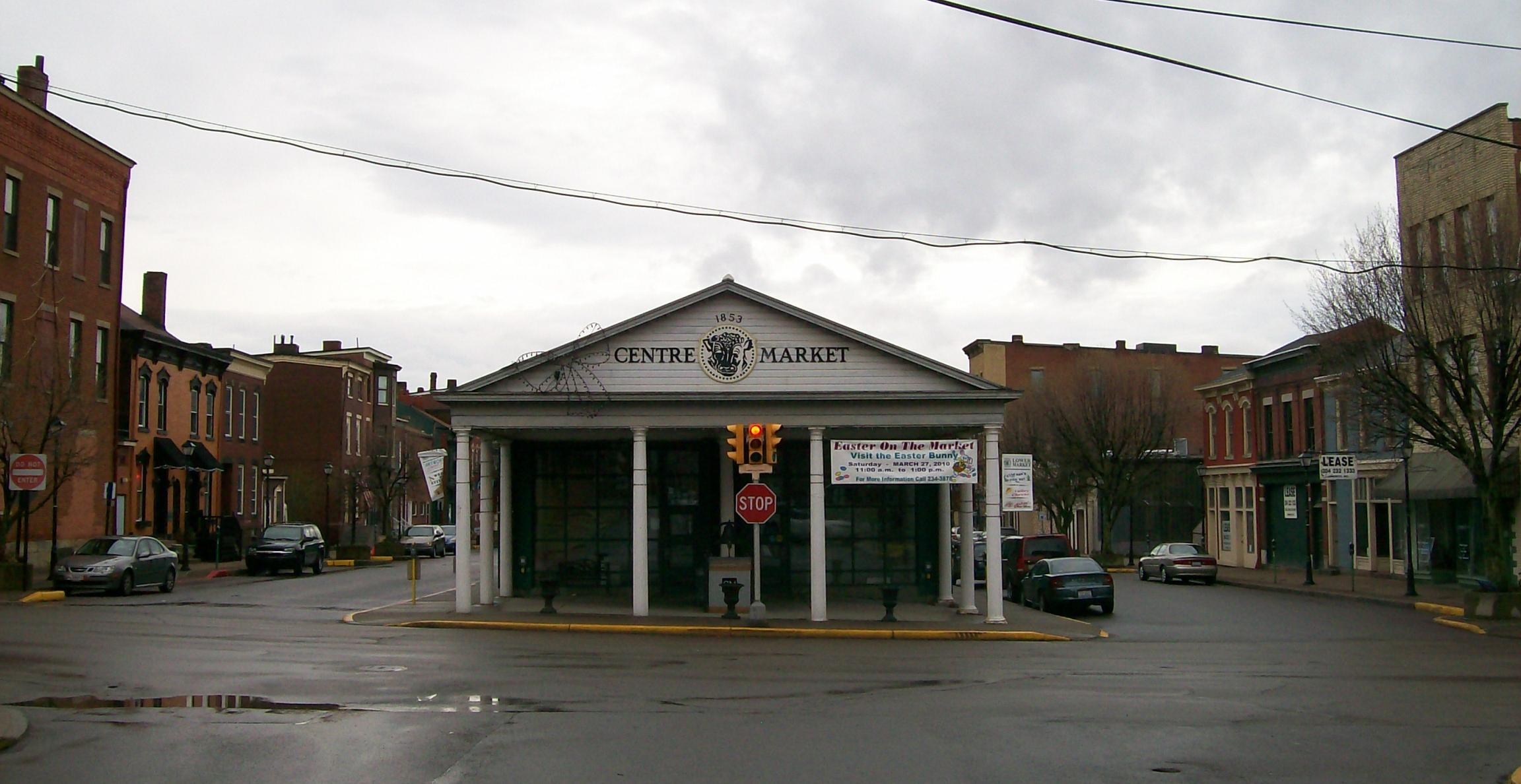
- Center Market Square Historic District, March 2010

- Location within West Virginia Location within the United States
- Location: Roughly Market St. between 20th and 23rd Sts.; also southern side of Main from Alley 19 to 20th St., and Chapline, Eoff and Charles Sts. bounded by Lane C, 22nd, and 24th Sts., Wheeling, West Virginia
- Coordinates: 40°3′36″N 80°43′25″W
- Area: 18.1 acres (7.3 ha)
- Architect: Multiple; Wells, E. W.
- Architectural style: Mixed (more Than 2 Styles From Different Periods), Late Victorian
- NRHP reference No.: 84003651, 87000127
- Added to NRHP: January 12, 1984, February 25, 1987 (boundary increase)

Centre Market Square Historic District is a historic district in Wheeling, West Virginia, listed on the National Register of Historic Places.

The district includes 181 contributing buildings in a variety of popular architectural styles dating from as early as about 1850. The district encompasses the area of Wheeling focused on the separately listed Center Wheeling Market. Notable buildings include the Second Presbyterian Church (1850), St. Alphonsus Church and School (1875, 1887), Mary A. Reed Building (c. 1885), Shaefer Building (1887), Bellinger Building (c. 1885), Schmeichel Building (c. 1900), Zink House (c. 1878), Lotz Building (c. 1873), Thoner House (c. 1877), Wheeling Public Library (1911), German Evangelical Lutheran Zion's Church (c. 1850, now Oglebay Institute-Towngate Theatre), 2333 Eoff Street (c. 1870–1900), 2227 Eoff Street (c. 1900–1915), 2330 Chapline Street (c. 1876), 2318 Chapline Street (c. 1901), townhouses on Chapline Street, (c. 1870s), 2325 Chapline Street, 2241 Chapline Street, 2233 Chapline Street, the Hellenic Orithodox Church of St. John the Divine (c. 1949–1951), St. John's United Church of Christ (c. 1907–1908), Michel Building (c. 1860–1870), Wheeling Fire Company-Hook and Ladder #6 (late 1870s-1880s), and the "Iron Building" (c. 1867).

It was listed on the National Register in 1984, with a boundary increase in 1987.
