= Viola, Marshall County, West Virginia =

Viola
- Unincorporated community
- Location within the state of West Virginia Viola (the United States)
- Coordinates: 39°57′54″N 80°35′23″W
- Country: United States
- State: West Virginia
- County: Marshall
- Elevation: 807 ft (246 m)
- Time zone: UTC-5 (Eastern (EST))
  - Summer (DST): UTC-4 (EDT)
- GNIS ID: 1549973

Viola is an unincorporated community in Marshall County, West Virginia, United States.
