= Victoria Theater (Wheeling, West Virginia) =

Oldest operational theater in West Virginia

Coordinates: 40.06659°N 80.72222°W

Victoria Theater in 2015

First opening its doors in 1904, Victoria Theater is the oldest operating theater in West Virginia. Located in the registered historic market district of the city of Wheeling, the Victoria is a ~800 seat Victorian style theater with many Beaux-Arts design influences. In 1934, the Victoria Theater served, for a short period, as home to the WWVA Jamboree (later renamed "Jamboree USA"), the second-longest running radio program in the U.S.

The Victoria Theater is also known as the Victoria Vaudeville Theater. It is located at Market Street between 12th and 14th streets in downtown Wheeling, West Virginia. The theater today serves as a venue for live acts, including an Elvis impersonator, country, bluegrass, rock, and gospel music. Magician Dennis Regling also performs regularly at the Victoria.

== See also ==
- WWVA Jamboree
