= WVLY (AM) =

- Moundsville, West Virginia; United States
- Frequency: 1370 kHz
- Branding: AM 1370 WVLY

Programming
- Format: Talk radio
- Affiliations: Ohio State Sports Network

Ownership
- Owner: RCK 1 Group, LLC
- Sister stations: WKKX

History
- Call sign meaning: Valley

Technical information
- Licensing authority: FCC
- Facility ID: 53369
- Class: D
- Power: 5,000 watts (day); 20 watts (night)
- Transmitter coordinates: 39°54′20″N 80°46′42″W
- Translator: 97.7 W249DU (Moundsville)

Links
- Public license information: Public file; LMS
- Website: watchdognetwork.com

WVLY (1370 AM) is a radio station broadcasting a talk format. Licensed to Moundsville, West Virginia, United States, the station is currently owned by RCK 1 Group, LLC.

WVLY is the current radio home of former U.S. Rep. Bob Ney

== Translator ==
Broadcast translator for WVLY
Call sign	Frequency	City of license	FID	ERP (W)	HAAT	Class	Transmitter coordinates	FCC info
W249DU	97.7 FM	Moundsville, West Virginia	200385	60	107 m (351 ft)	D	39°54′19.2″N 80°46′42.3″W	LMS
