= Çalış =

Çalış may refer to:

== People ==
- Taşkın Çalış (born 1993), Turkish footballer

== Places ==
- Çalış, Haymana, town in Ankara Province, Turkey
