= Calis, West Virginia =

Unincorporated community in West Virginia, United States

Calis
- Unincorporated community
- Location within the state of West Virginia Calis (the United States)
- Coordinates: 39°56′21″N 80°33′3″W
- Country: United States
- State: West Virginia
- County: Marshall
- Elevation: 1,322 ft (403 m)
- Time zone: UTC-5 (Eastern (EST))
  - Summer (DST): UTC-4 (EDT)
- GNIS ID: 1554051

Calis is an unincorporated community in Marshall County, West Virginia, United States.
