= Wheeling, West Virginia =

City in West Virginia, US

- City
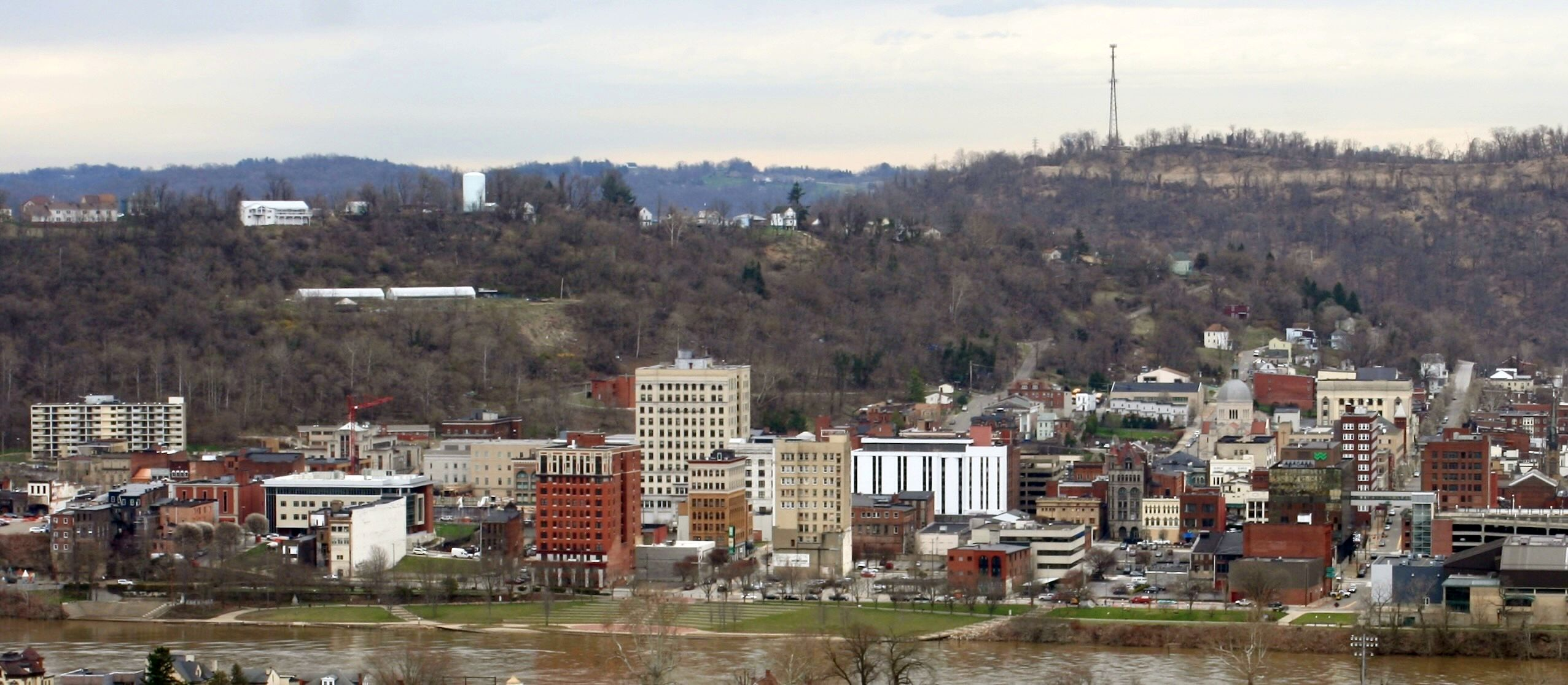
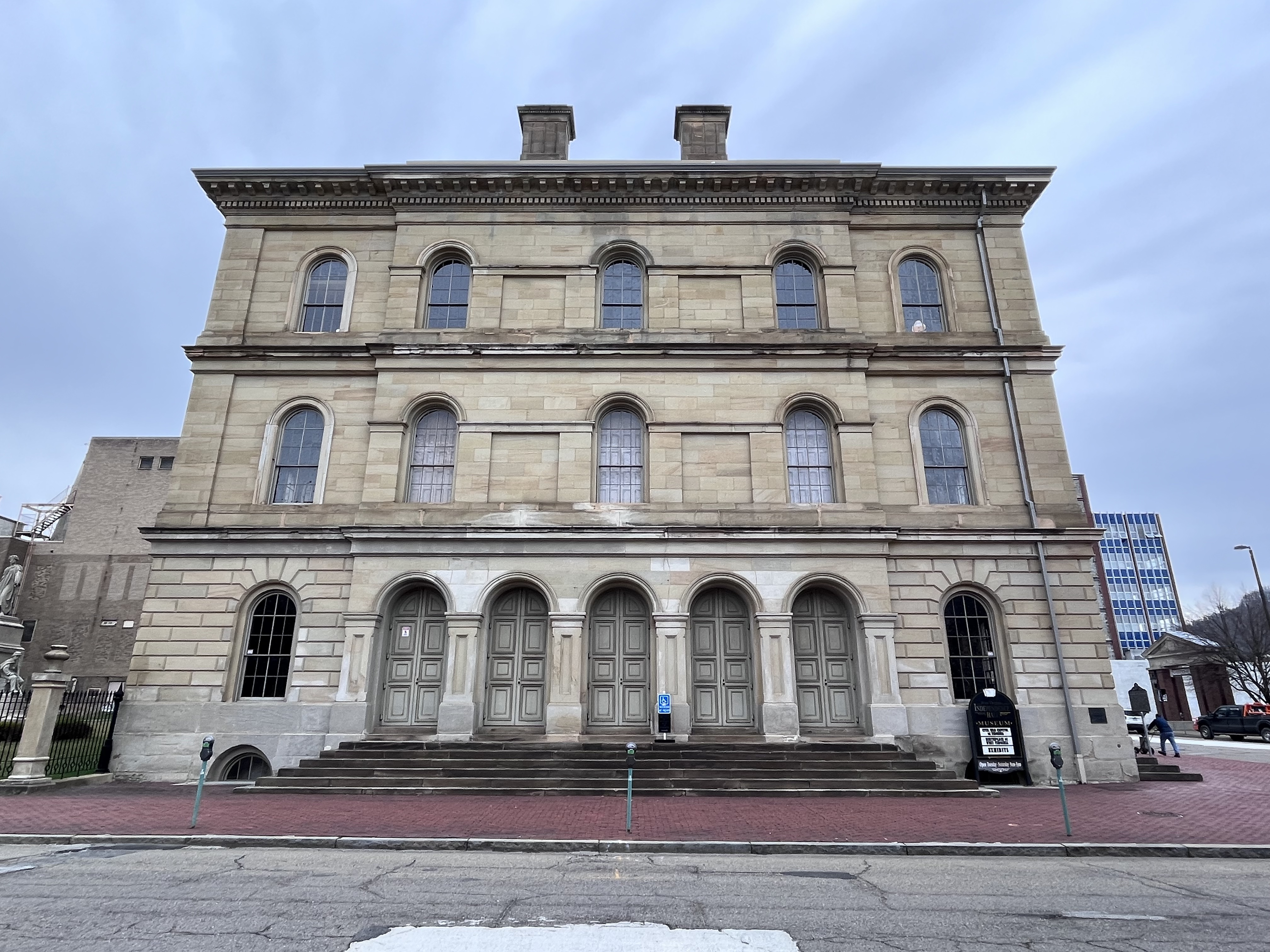
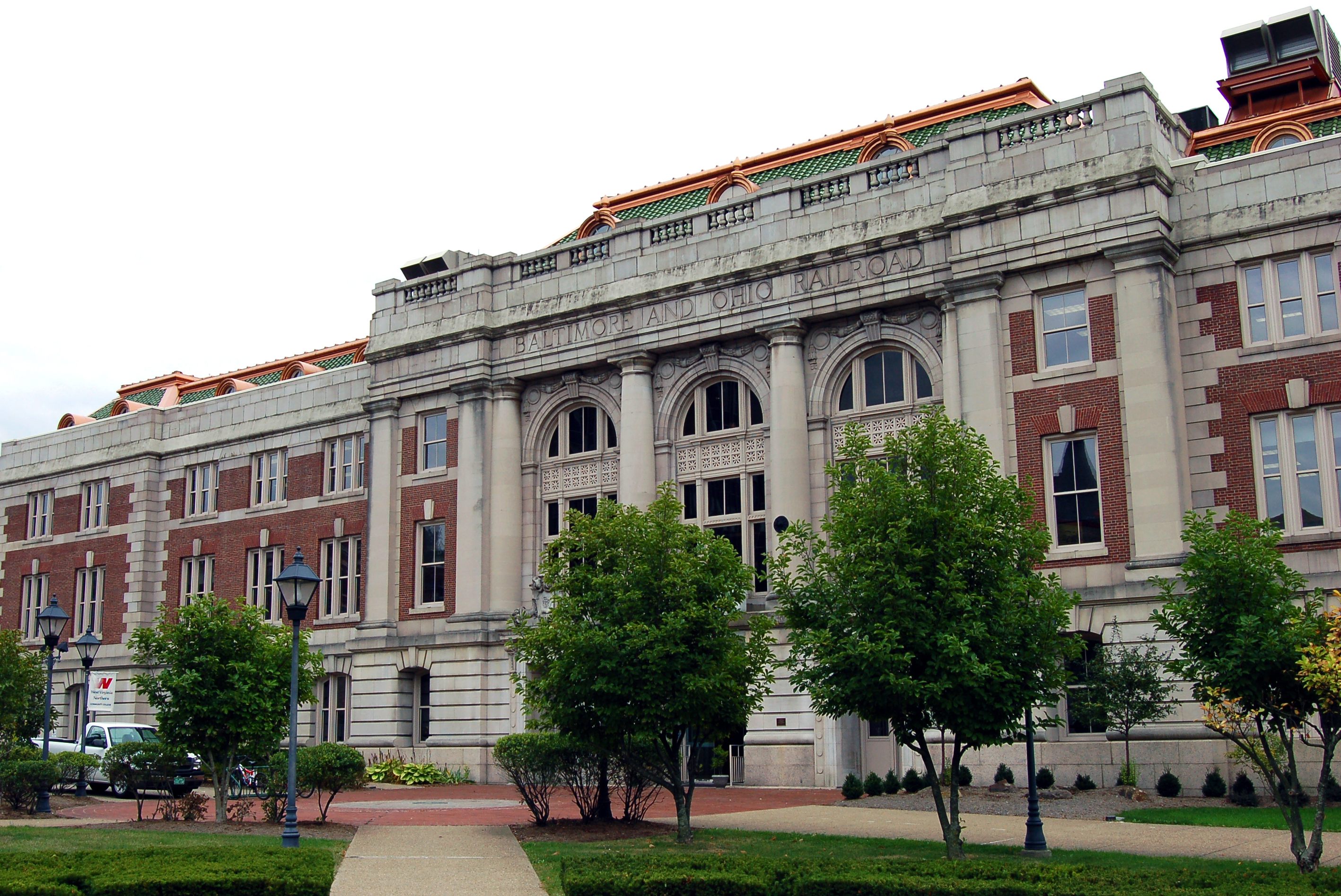
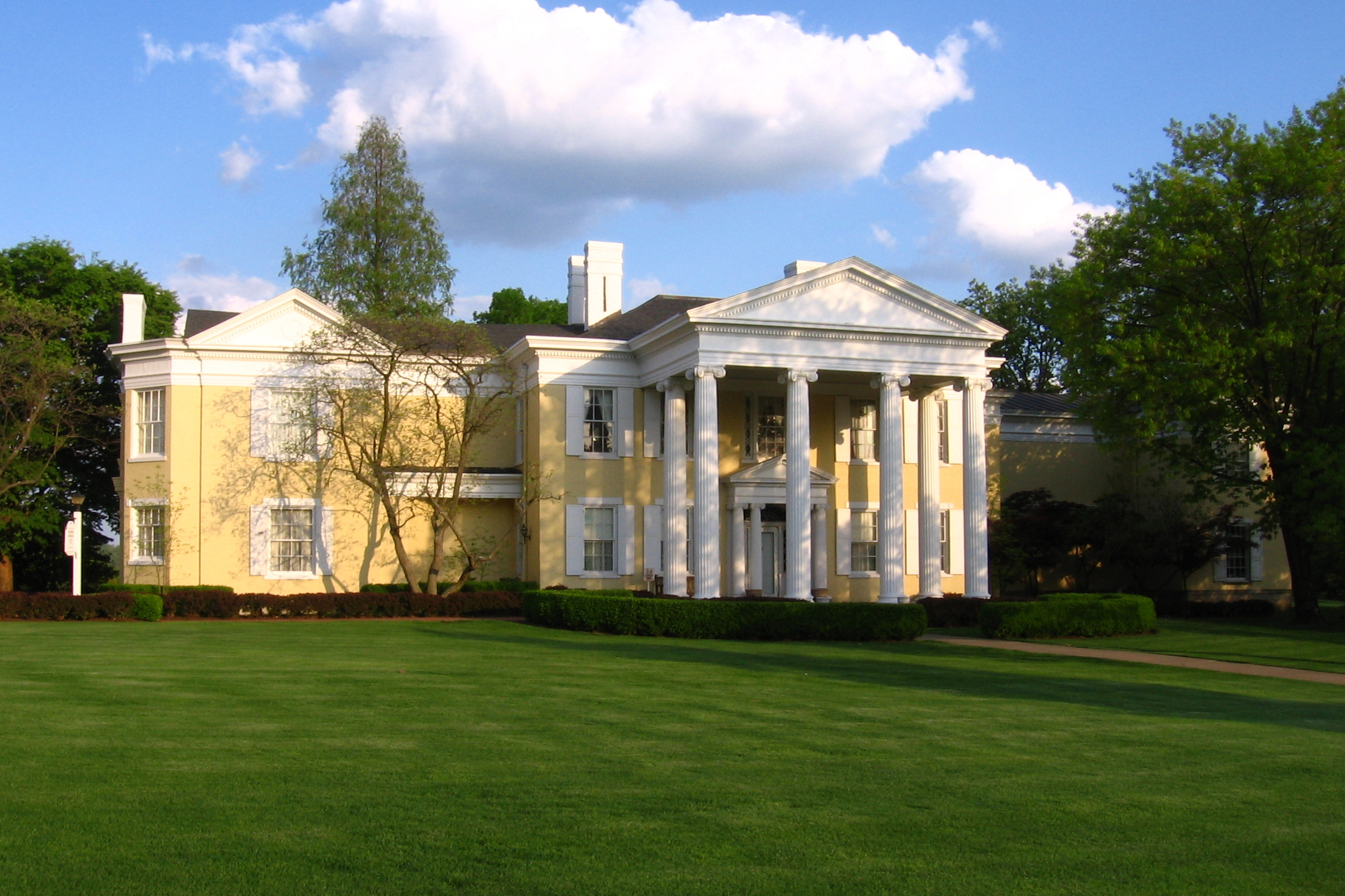
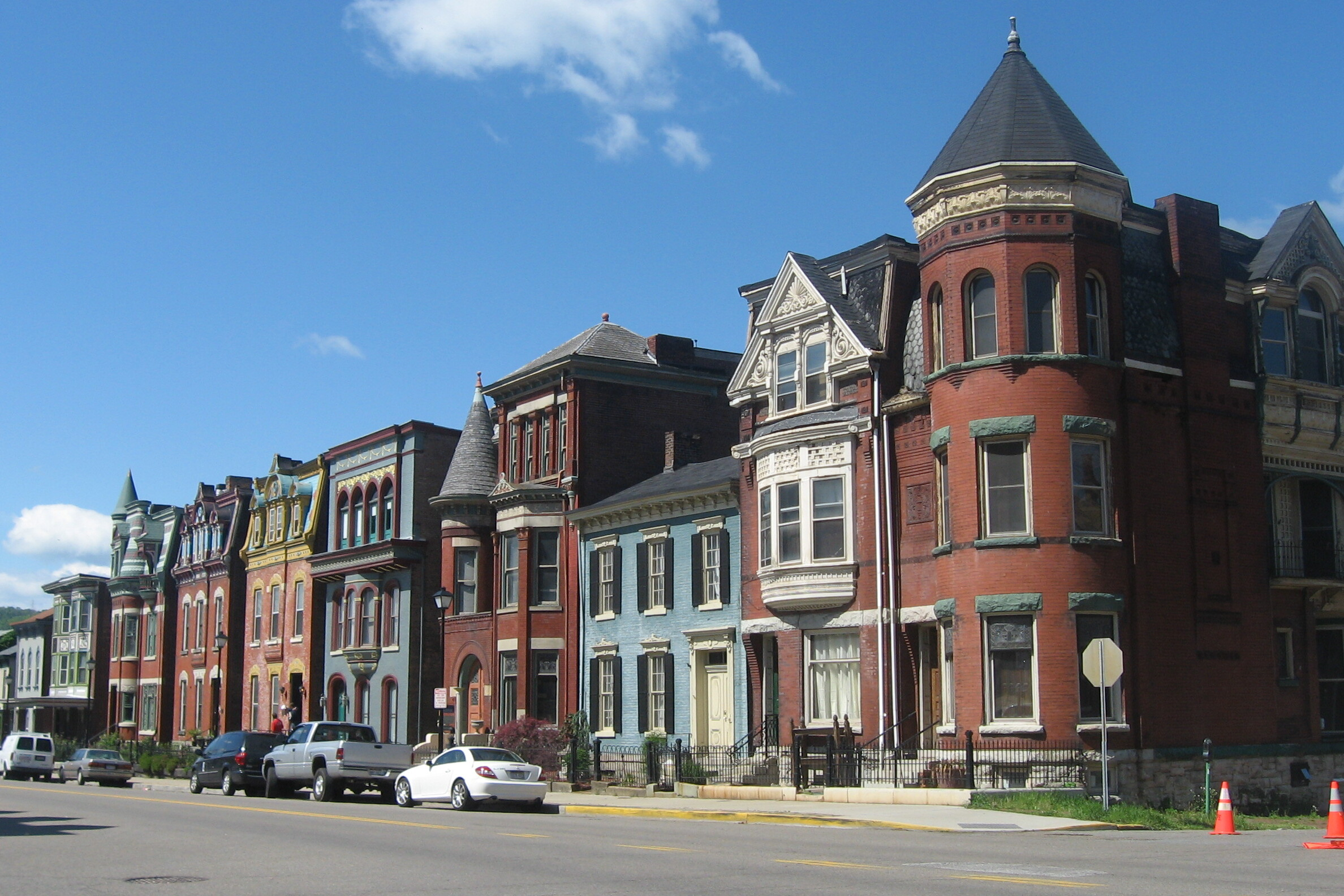
- Downtown Wheeling Independence Hall Wheeling station Oglebay Park Chapline Street

- Flag Seal
- Nickname: The Friendly City
- Interactive map of Wheeling, West Virginia
- Location within West Virginia Location within the United States
- Coordinates: 40°4′13″N 80°41′55″W
- Country: United States
- State: West Virginia
- County: Ohio, Marshall
- Settled: 1769; 257 years ago
- Established: 1806; 220 years ago
- Incorporated: 1836; 190 years ago

Government
  - Mayor: Denny Magruder
  - City manager: Robert Herron

Area
  - City: 16.00 sq mi (41.43 km^{2})
  - Land: 13.78 sq mi (35.68 km^{2})
  - Water: 2.22 sq mi (5.76 km^{2}) 13.87%
- Elevation: 686–1,299 ft (209–396 m)

Population (2020)
  - City: 27,052
  - Density: 1,963.8/sq mi (758.2/km^{2})
  - Urban: 81,249 (US: 353rd)
  - Metro: 139,513 (US: 288th)
- Time zone: UTC−5 (EST)
  - Summer (DST): UTC−4 (EDT)
- ZIP Code: 26003
- Area code: 304
- FIPS code: 54-86452
- GNIS feature ID: 1548994
- Website: www.wheelingwv.gov

Wheeling is a city in Ohio and Marshall counties in the U.S. state of West Virginia. The county seat of Ohio County, it lies along the Ohio River in the foothills of the Appalachian Mountains within the state's northern panhandle. It is the fifth-most populous city in West Virginia and the most populous city in the northern panhandle with a population of 27,062 at the 2020 census. The Wheeling metropolitan area had 139,513 residents in 2020.

Wheeling was settled in 1769 on land contested between the Province of Pennsylvania and Colony of Virginia, and later grew to become Virginia's largest city west of the Appalachian Mountains. During the American Civil War, it was the host of the Wheeling Conventions which led to the separation of West Virginia from Virginia. Wheeling was the state capital of West Virginia from 1861 to 1870, and again from 1875 to 1885.

Wheeling became a manufacturing center in the late nineteenth century due to its location along major transportation routes, including the Ohio River, National Road, and the Baltimore and Ohio Railroad. After the decline of heavy industry and subsequent population loss following World War II, its major industries now include healthcare, education, legal services, entertainment and tourism, and energy. The city is located about 60 miles (97 km) west of Pittsburgh and 120 miles (190 km) east of Columbus via Interstate 70.

== History ==
The origins of the name "Wheeling" are disputed. One of the more credible explanations is that the word comes from the Lenni-Lenape phrase wih link or wee lunk, which meant "place of the head" or "place of the skull." This name supposedly referred to a white settler who was scalped and decapitated. His severed head was displayed at the confluence of Wheeling Creek and the Ohio River. Earlier sources say that the head was that of a Native American prisoner, not a settler. Native Americans had inhabited the area for thousands of years. In the 17th century, the Iroquois from present-day New York state conquered the upper Ohio Valley, pushing out other tribes and maintaining the area as their hunting ground.

=== European settlement ===
Originally explored by the French, Wheeling still has a lead plate remnant that the explorer Céloron de Blainville buried in 1749 at the mouth of Wheeling Creek to mark his claim. Later, Christopher Gist and George Washington surveyed the land, in 1751 and 1770, respectively.

During the fall of 1769, Ebenezer Zane explored the Wheeling area and established a claim to the land via "tomahawk rights", the practice of girdling a few trees at a prominent site and marking the bark with the initials or name of the person making the claim. He returned the following spring with his wife Elizabeth and his brothers, Jonathan and Silas; they established the first permanent European settlement in the Wheeling area, naming it Zanesburg. Other families joined the settlement, including the Shepherds (see Monument Place), the Wetzels, and the McCollochs (see McColloch's Leap).

In 1787, the United States gave Virginia this portion of lands west of the Appalachians, and some to Pennsylvania at its western edge, to settle their claims. The Northwest Ordinance that year established the Northwest Territory to cover other lands north of the Ohio River and west to the Mississippi River. Settlers began to move into new areas along the Ohio.

In 1793, Ebenezer Zane divided the town into lots, and Wheeling was officially established as a town in 1795 by legislative enactment. By an act of the Virginia General Assembly on December 27, 1797, Wheeling was named the county seat of Ohio County. The town was incorporated on January 16, 1805. On March 11, 1836, the town of Wheeling was incorporated into the city of Wheeling.

=== Fort Henry ===
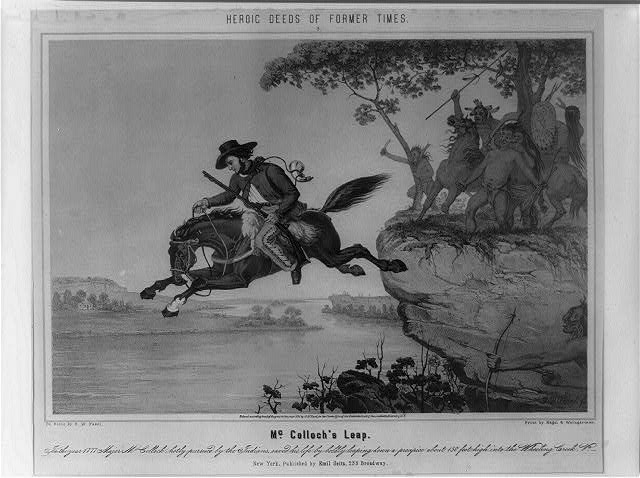
McColloch's Leap

Originally dubbed Fort Fincastle in 1774, the fort was later renamed Fort Henry in honor of Virginia's American governor, Patrick Henry. In 1777, Native Americans of the Shawnee, Wyandot, and Mingo tribes joined to attack pioneer settlements along the upper Ohio River, which were illegal according to the Crown's Proclamation of 1763. They hoped an alliance with the British would drive the colonial settlers out of their territory. Local men defended the fort, later joined by recruits from Fort Shepherd (in Elm Grove) and Fort Holliday. The native force burned the surrounding cabins and destroyed livestock.

During the first attack of the year, Major Samuel McColloch led a small force of men from Fort Vanmetre along Short Creek to assist the besieged Fort Henry. Separated from his men, McColloch was chased by attacking natives. Upon his horse, McColloch charged up Wheeling Hill and made what is known as McColloch's Leap 300 feet (91 m) down its eastern side.

In 1782, a native army along with British soldiers attempted to take Fort Henry. During this siege, Fort Henry's supply of ammunition was exhausted. The defenders decided to dispatch a man to secure more ammunition from the Zane homestead. Betty Zane volunteered for the dangerous task. During her departing run, she was heckled by both native and British soldiers. After reaching the Zane homestead, she gathered a tablecloth and filled it with gunpowder. During her return, she was fired upon but was uninjured. As a result of her heroism, Fort Henry remained in American control.

=== Early 19th century ===
Panoramic map of Wheeling from Chapline Hill in 1854, with list of sites

The National Road arrived in Wheeling in 1818, linking the Ohio River to the Potomac River, and allowing goods from the Ohio Valley to flow through Wheeling and on to points east. As the endpoint of the National Road, Wheeling became a gateway to early westward expansion. In 1849 the Wheeling Suspension Bridge crossed the Ohio River and allowed the city to expand onto Wheeling Island. Lessons learned in constructing the bridge were used in the construction of the Brooklyn Bridge. Rail transportation reached Wheeling in 1853 when the Baltimore and Ohio Railroad connected Wheeling to Pennsylvania, Maryland, and markets in the Northeast. A new bridge connected the city to Bellaire, Ohio, just across the river, and to western areas of the U.S.

Much of the area had been settled by yeoman farmers, few of whom owned slaves. With the railroad, a larger industrial or mercantile middle class developed that depended on free labor; it felt either disinterest or hostility to slavery. The Wheeling Intelligencer newspaper expressed the area's anti-secession sentiment as tensions rose over slavery and national issues. The city became part of the movement of western areas to secede from Virginia after the beginning of the Civil War, hosting the Wheeling Convention of 1861. It served as the provisional capital of the Restored Government of Virginia from 1861 to 1863, and became the first capital of West Virginia after the state seceded from Virginia and was admitted to the Union in its own right in 1863. From the acceptance of the new state of West Virginia into the union until the Restored Government of Virginia's move to Alexandria in August of the same year, Wheeling was the state capital of both West Virginia and Virginia.

The growing German population, which included immigrants after the 1848 Revolutions, was firmly anti-slavery. The Germans of Wheeling organized the "First West Virginia Artillery" to oppose the Confederacy and played a role in the initial movement to separate from Virginia. The Germans' culture influenced the city, such as their "German Singing Societies", the first of which began in 1855.

=== Late 19th century ===
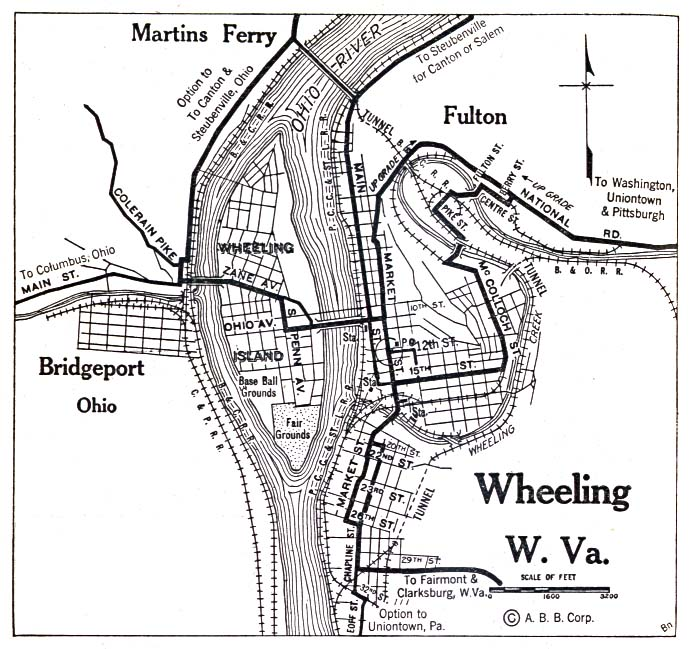
Map of Wheeling in 1920

Although Wheeling lost its position as state capital in 1865, it continued to grow. In the late nineteenth century, Wheeling was the new state's prime industrial center. One early nickname (until an 1885 strike) was "Nail City", reflecting the iron manufacture in several mills, which dated from the 1840s. Mills transformed pig iron into sheets that could be cut, and some mills also produced boiler plates, stoves, barrel rings, and/or ornamental ironwork. Noted businesses of the era included the Bloch Brothers Tobacco Company (owned by state senator Jesse A. Bloch, who would in 1913 introduce legislation that became the state's Workmen's Compensation Act), and later steel concerns after development of the Bessemer process.

The city's earliest union was the United Nailers (1860, which later merged into the Amalgamated Association of Iron and Steel Workers), followed by the cigar makers in 1862. The 1877 railroad strike at Martinsburg, West Virginia, reached Wheeling and spread nationwide. In 1897, Eugene Debs, Mother Jones, and Samuel Gompers were among the speakers at a national labor convention in Wheeling to discuss a nationwide coal strike.

In 1866, Lincoln School opened in Wheeling to serve African American students. Lincoln High School was taught by Laura Grayson-Morison. A new building for Lincoln High School opened in the early 1940s; the school closed with desegregation in 1954.

=== 20th century to present ===
In 1904, Wheeling became the first city in the country to refuse a proposed Andrew Carnegie gift of a free library, because of the industrialist's labor record, especially the notorious Homestead Strike of 1892. By contrast, cigar tycoon Augustus Pollack (despite once rousing controversy by a plan to use convict labor) left many bequests to the labor movement, which erected a memorial statue. Wheeling Steel Corporation was created in 1920 and grew after a 1927 strike caused J. P. Morgan and other investors to sell National Tube Company, which had been created in 1899, six years after local owners had consolidated five plants in the area as Wheeling Steel & Iron Company.

Wheeling reached a peak population of 61,659 at the 1930 census. As the city grew, prosperous Wheeling residents built fine houses, especially on Wheeling Island, but slums also expanded. As a result of that growth, an ordinance was passed regulating personal cesspools, including a ban on pipe communications with other homes and businesses unless offensive smells were properly trapped.

The Great Depression, and later changes and restructuring in heavy industry following World War II, led to a loss of working-class jobs and population. Capitalizing on its rich architectural heritage, Wheeling has worked to revive its Main Street with the Downtown Wheeling Streetscape project. Additionally, the city has been redeveloping the historic 1400 Market Street, just one block east of Main Street.

In March 1997, Mark Storm, a recent mental patient dischargee, went on a shooting spree, killing his wife, his two daughters, his brother and his mother, before killing himself on a boat in the middle of the lake. It is the deadliest mass shooting in West Virginia history alongside the 2020 Williamsburg massacre.

== Geography ==
Wheeling is located at 40°4′13″N 80°41′55″W (40.070348, -80.698604). The city has a total area of 16.01 square miles (41.47 km^{2}), of which 13.79 square miles (35.72 km^{2}) is land and 2.22 square miles (5.75 km^{2}) is water.

Wheeling is located in northern West Virginia, on what is known as the Northern Panhandle. The area lies within the ecoregion of the Western Allegheny Plateau. The city is directly across the river from the state of Ohio and only 11 miles (18 km) west of Pennsylvania. It is a part of the tri-state area of Ohio, Pennsylvania, and West Virginia, which is commonly referred to as the Ohio River Valley Region or "The Ohio Valley".

Wheeling Creek flows through the city, and meets the Ohio River in downtown Wheeling.

The city is located both on the West Virginia side of the Ohio River, and on an island in the middle of the river called Wheeling Island.

=== Neighborhoods ===
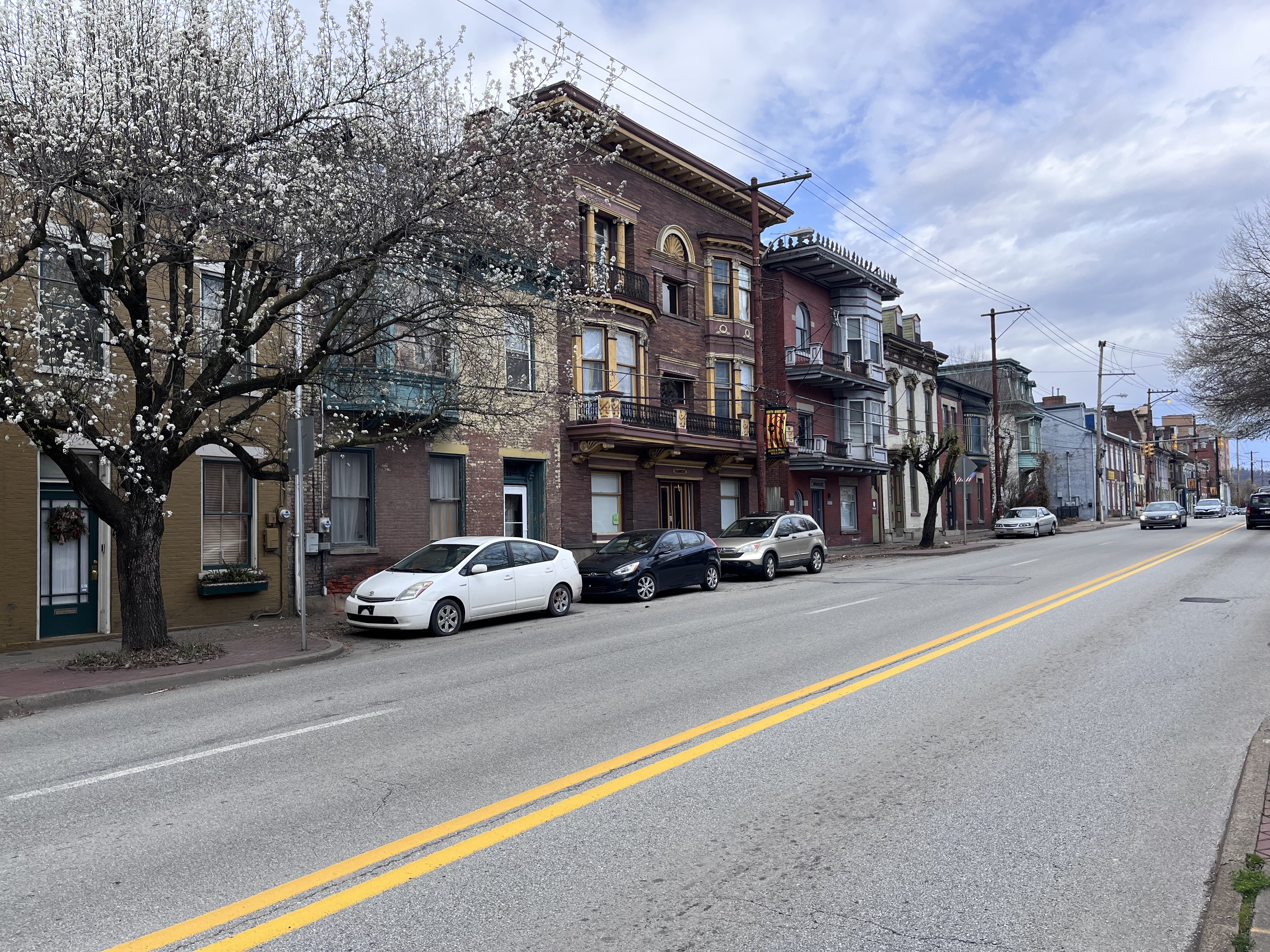
North Wheeling Historic District

The following neighborhoods lie within the city limits:

- Arbordale
- Benwood (mostly in Marshall County)
- Bethlehem
- Center Wheeling
- Clator
- Dimmeydale
- Downtown
- East Wheeling
- Echo Point
- Edgwood
- Elm Grove
- Elm Terrace
- Fulton
- Glenova/North Warwood
- Glenwood
- Goosetown
- Greggsville
- Leatherwood
- Loveland/South Warwood
- Morningside
- Mozart (partially in Marshall County)
- Mount Olivet (mostly in Marshall County)
- North Park
- North Wheeling
- Oakmont
- Oakmont Hills
- Oak Park
- Oglebay Park
- Overbrook
- Park View
- Pleasanton
- Pleasant Valley/"Silk Stocking Row"
- Richietown (northern South Wheeling)
- Rio Vista (accessible only through the Village of Bethlehem)
- Roney's Point
- Sherrard (in Marshall County)
- South Wheeling
- Springdale
- Warwood
- Triadelphia
- Wheeling Heights (Grandview Heights)
- Wheeling Island
- Woodsdale (formerly Woodlawn)

=== Climate ===
Wheeling lies at the boundary between the humid subtropical and humid continental climate zones (Köppen: Cfa/Dfa, respectively). The annual precipitation is about 41.88 in (1,064 mm) inches, distributed evenly throughout the year.

Climate data for Wheeling, West Virginia (1991–2020 normals, extremes 1891–1933, 1987–present)
Month	Jan	Feb	Mar	Apr	May	Jun	Jul	Aug	Sep	Oct	Nov	Dec	Year
Record high °F (°C)	80 (27)	78 (26)	90 (32)	99 (37)	100 (38)	104 (40)	106 (41)	110 (43)	103 (39)	96 (36)	83 (28)	72 (22)	110 (43)
Mean maximum °F (°C)	63.3 (17.4)	63.6 (17.6)	74.7 (23.7)	83.1 (28.4)	87.5 (30.8)	91.6 (33.1)	92.7 (33.7)	92.4 (33.6)	89.7 (32.1)	82.0 (27.8)	73.0 (22.8)	63.0 (17.2)	94.2 (34.6)
Mean daily maximum °F (°C)	38.7 (3.7)	41.8 (5.4)	51.2 (10.7)	64.5 (18.1)	73.9 (23.3)	81.4 (27.4)	85.0 (29.4)	84.6 (29.2)	78.7 (25.9)	66.4 (19.1)	53.7 (12.1)	43.2 (6.2)	63.6 (17.6)
Daily mean °F (°C)	30.2 (−1.0)	32.5 (0.3)	40.5 (4.7)	52.1 (11.2)	62.0 (16.7)	70.4 (21.3)	74.4 (23.6)	73.6 (23.1)	67.4 (19.7)	55.2 (12.9)	43.7 (6.5)	35.1 (1.7)	53.1 (11.7)
Mean daily minimum °F (°C)	21.7 (−5.7)	23.1 (−4.9)	29.8 (−1.2)	39.6 (4.2)	50.1 (10.1)	59.3 (15.2)	63.8 (17.7)	62.7 (17.1)	56.1 (13.4)	44.0 (6.7)	33.7 (0.9)	26.9 (−2.8)	42.6 (5.9)
Mean minimum °F (°C)	4.6 (−15.2)	8.0 (−13.3)	14.1 (−9.9)	27.5 (−2.5)	38.3 (3.5)	47.4 (8.6)	54.7 (12.6)	54.0 (12.2)	43.8 (6.6)	32.2 (0.1)	21.4 (−5.9)	12.9 (−10.6)	1.4 (−17.0)
Record low °F (°C)	−21 (−29)	−26 (−32)	−11 (−24)	5 (−15)	19 (−7)	31 (−1)	38 (3)	34 (1)	26 (−3)	16 (−9)	−2 (−19)	−11 (−24)	−26 (−32)
Average precipitation inches (mm)	3.44 (87)	2.67 (68)	3.78 (96)	3.52 (89)	4.20 (107)	4.26 (108)	4.09 (104)	3.19 (81)	3.50 (89)	2.94 (75)	2.90 (74)	3.39 (86)	41.88 (1,064)
Average snowfall inches (cm)	7.5 (19)	7.4 (19)	3.2 (8.1)	0.2 (0.51)	0.0 (0.0)	0.0 (0.0)	0.0 (0.0)	0.0 (0.0)	0.0 (0.0)	0.0 (0.0)	0.4 (1.0)	3.6 (9.1)	22.3 (56.71)
Average precipitation days (≥ 0.01 in)	15.8	13.5	14.0	14.4	13.8	12.7	11.2	9.9	9.2	10.4	11.7	14.6	151.2
Average snowy days (≥ 0.1 in)	4.4	4.3	1.6	0.2	0.0	0.0	0.0	0.0	0.0	0.0	0.6	3.2	14.3
Source: NOAA

== Demographics ==
Historical population
Census	Pop.	Note	%±
1840	7,885		—
1850	11,435		45.0%
1860	14,083		23.2%
1870	19,280		36.9%
1880	30,737		59.4%
1890	34,522		12.3%
1900	38,878		12.6%
1910	41,641		7.1%
1920	56,208		35.0%
1930	61,659		9.7%
1940	61,099		−0.9%
1950	58,891		−3.6%
1960	53,400		−9.3%
1970	48,188		−9.8%
1980	43,070		−10.6%
1990	34,882		−19.0%
2000	31,419		−9.9%
2010	28,486		−9.3%
2020	27,052		−5.0%
U.S. Decennial Census

=== 2020 census ===
As of the 2020 census, Wheeling had a population of 27,052. The median age was 44.2 years; 19.1% of residents were under the age of 18 and 23.2% were 65 years of age or older. For every 100 females there were 94.0 males, and for every 100 females age 18 and over there were 90.3 males age 18 and over.

86.9% of residents lived in urban areas, while 13.1% lived in rural areas.

There were 12,359 households in Wheeling; 22.6% had children under the age of 18 living in them. Of all households, 35.2% were married-couple households, 22.5% were households with a male householder and no spouse or partner present, and 34.6% were households with a female householder and no spouse or partner present. About 40.9% of all households were made up of individuals and 18.9% had someone living alone who was 65 years of age or older.

There were 14,407 housing units, of which 14.2% were vacant. The homeowner vacancy rate was 2.6% and the rental vacancy rate was 11.7%.

The median income for a household in the city was $43,483 and the poverty rate was 16.5%.

Racial composition as of the 2020 census
Race	Number	Percent
White	23,412	86.5%
Black or African American	1,476	5.5%
American Indian and Alaska Native	43	0.2%
Asian	292	1.1%
Native Hawaiian and Other Pacific Islander	11	0.0%
Some other race	191	0.7%
Two or more races	1,627	6.0%
Hispanic or Latino (of any race)	455	1.7%

=== 2010 census ===
As of the census of 2010, there were 28,486 people, 12,816 households, and 6,949 families residing in the city. The population density was 2,065.7 inhabitants per square mile (797.6/km^{2}). There were 14,661 housing units, at an average density of 1,063.2 per square mile (410.5/km^{2}). The racial makeup of the city was 91.2% White, 5.1% African American, 0.2% Native American, 0.9% Asian, 0.2% from other races, and 2.4% from two or more races. Hispanic or Latino people of any race were 0.9% of the population.

There were 12,816 households, of which 22.6% had children under the age of 18 living with them, 37.6% were married couples living together, 12.7% had a female householder with no husband present, 4.0% had a male householder with no wife present, and 45.8% were non-families. 40.4% of all households were made up of individuals, and 17.5% had someone living alone who was 65 years of age or older. The average household size was 2.11 and the average family size was 2.84.

The median age in the city was 45.2 years. 18.5% of residents were under the age of 18; 9.4% were between the ages of 18 and 24; 21.8% were from 25 to 44; 29.8% were from 45 to 64; and 20.6% were 65 years of age or older. The gender makeup of the city was 46.9% male and 53.1% female.

=== 2000 census ===
As of the census of 2000, 31,419 people, 13,719 households, and 7,806 families resided in the city. The population density was 2,258.4 people per square mile (872.1/km^{2}). 15,706 housing units were present, at an average density of 1,128.9 per square mile (436.0/km^{2}). The racial makeup of the city was 92.72% White, 4.99% African American, 0.10% Native American, 0.91% Asian, 0.03% Pacific Islander, 0.16% from other races, and 1.09% from two or more races. Hispanic or Latino people of any race were 0.58% of the population.

There were 13,719 households, of which 23.4% included children under the age of 18, 41.8% were married couples living together, 12.2% had a female householder with no husband present, and 43.1% were non-families. 38.3% of all households were made up of individuals, and 18.6% had someone living alone who was at least 65 years of age. The average household size was 2.17 and the average family size was 2.89.

The median age was 42 years. 20.6% of residents were under the age of 18, 9.1% from 18 to 24, 24.3% from 25 to 44, 24.5% from 45 to 64, and 21.6% at least 65 years old. For every 100 females 84.1 males were present, and for every 100 females age 18 and over, there were 79.6 males.

The median household income was $27,388, and the median family income was $38,708. Males had a median income of $30,750 versus $22,099 for females. The per capita income for the city was $17,923. About 13.1% of families and 18.0% of the population were below the poverty line, including 23.3% of those under age 18 and 11.2% of those at least 65 years old.

== Arts and culture ==
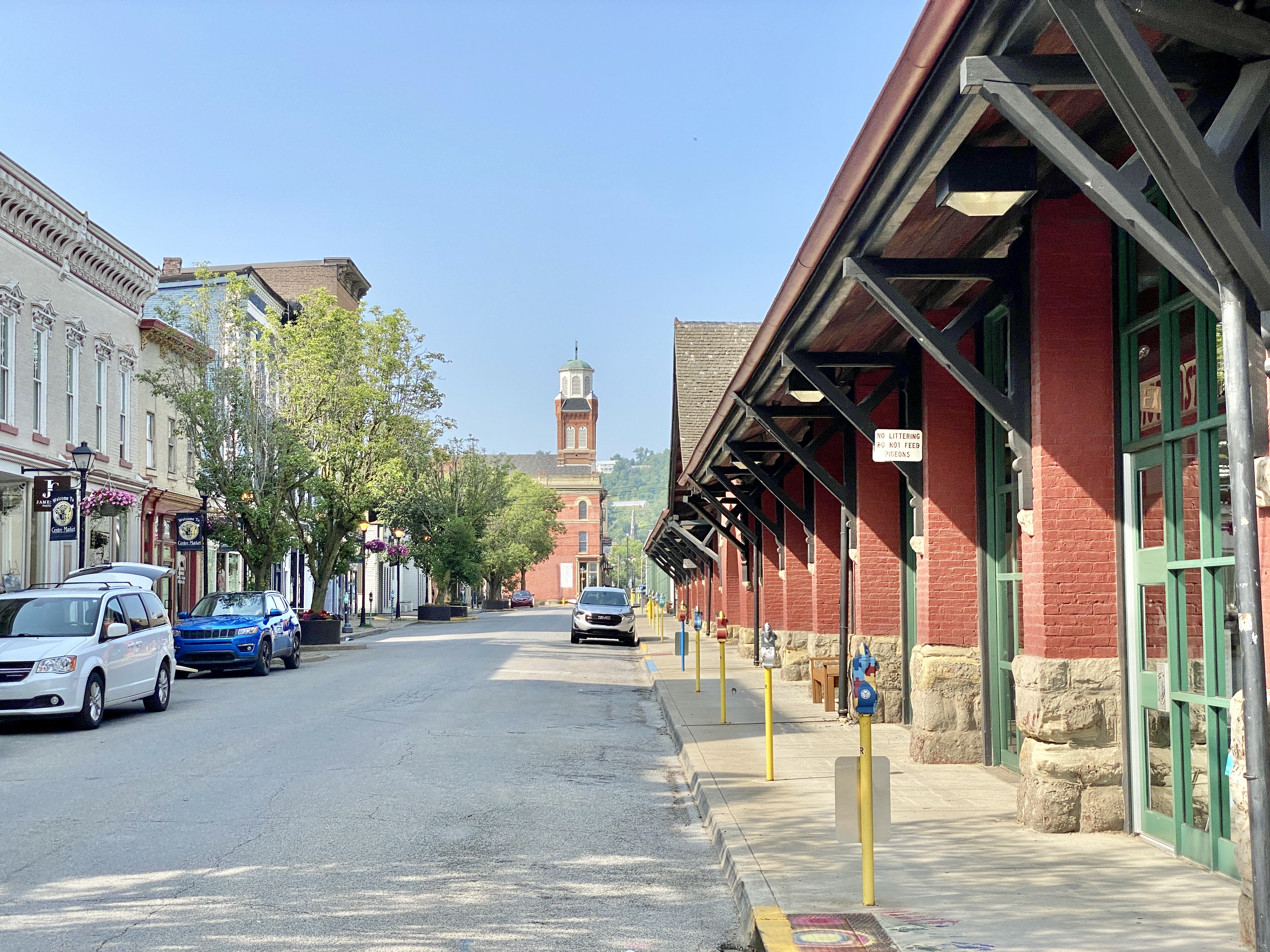
Centre Market is the focal point of the Centre Market Square Historic District.

West Virginia Independence Hall was the site of the Wheeling Convention, two meetings held in 1861 that ultimately reversed Virginia's Ordinance of Secession. 26 counties in Virginia's north and west voted against secession from the Union and created the new state of West Virginia, which the United States quickly admitted. Later in 1861 and continuing to 1863, the building was the site of many heated debates during the First Constitutional Convention of West Virginia, including the name of the new state. The oldest building in the area is Shepherd Hall (Monument Place), built in 1798.

Centre Market consists of two buildings in an open-air market, built in 1853 and 1890. The market house and the surrounding area have been adapted for use as retail shops and restaurants.

Wheeling is home to one of twelve Madonna of the Trail monuments along the National Old Trails Road that commemorate the spirit of pioneer women in the United States.

The first official memorial monument in the state of West Virginia dedicated specifically to men killed in the Vietnam War was dedicated in Wheeling, with full military honors, in a Memorial Day 1986 ceremony. The monument was erected in front of the flagpole near the main shelter of Bethlehem Community Park in the village of Bethlehem, just southeast of Wheeling. The roughly 6-foot-high granite memorial consists of a large bronze dedication plaque with the names of KIAs from the Wheeling/Ohio County region. Below the dedication plaque is a bronze map of South Vietnam, complete with names of 28 major cities.

=== Music and theater ===
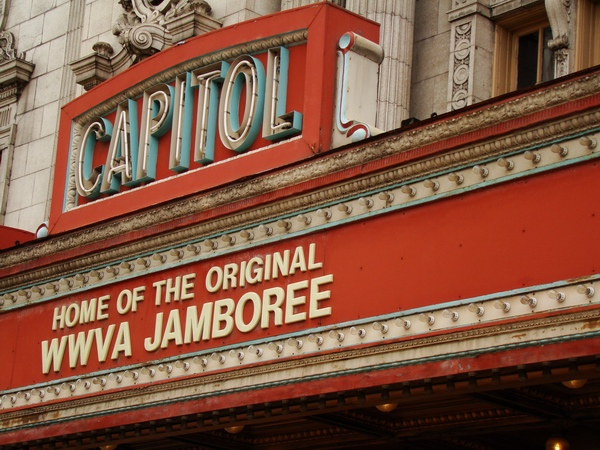
Capitol Theatre marquee

Wheeling has a long tradition of live musical performance and radio broadcasting. With over 2,500 seats, The Capitol Theatre is the largest theatre in West Virginia. Opened in 1928, the Capitol was home to It's Wheeling Steel, a popular radio program in the early 1940s featuring musical performances by workers at a local steel plant. The Capitol has welcomed musical performances of all types, from Johnny Cash, Merle Haggard, and Tammy Wynette, to Ray Charles, Bob Dylan, B.B. King, and Black Sabbath. Other past performers include Jerry Seinfeld, David Copperfield, and George Carlin. The Wheeling Symphony Orchestra is housed at the Capitol Theatre and performs a range of contemporary, classical, and seasonal arrangements.

The Capitol Theatre also hosts numerous touring musical performances. The Oglebay Institute's Towngate Theatre in Center Wheeling has produced plays for over 35 years. Wheeling is also home to the Victoria Theater, the oldest theater in West Virginia. The 700-seat Victorian-style theater was home to the WWVA Jamboree program from 1933 to 1936. More recently, it has been the site for the "Wheeling Jamboree", a local initiative started in 2009 and modeled after the original WWVA Jamboree (which changed its name in the 1960s to Jamboree U.S.A.). The original WWVA Jamboree ran from 1933 to 2007, making it the second-longest-running country radio program and variety show in the country, after the Grand Ole Opry in Nashville, Tennessee.

Live music emanates from the amphitheatre at the Wheeling Heritage Port several nights per week from mid-spring through late fall. The waterfront park area hosts festivals, concerts, movie nights, celebrations, a regatta, and numerous visits from the Delta, Mississippi and American Queen riverboats. The port holds over 8,000 spectators and has become a city focal point.

== Sports ==
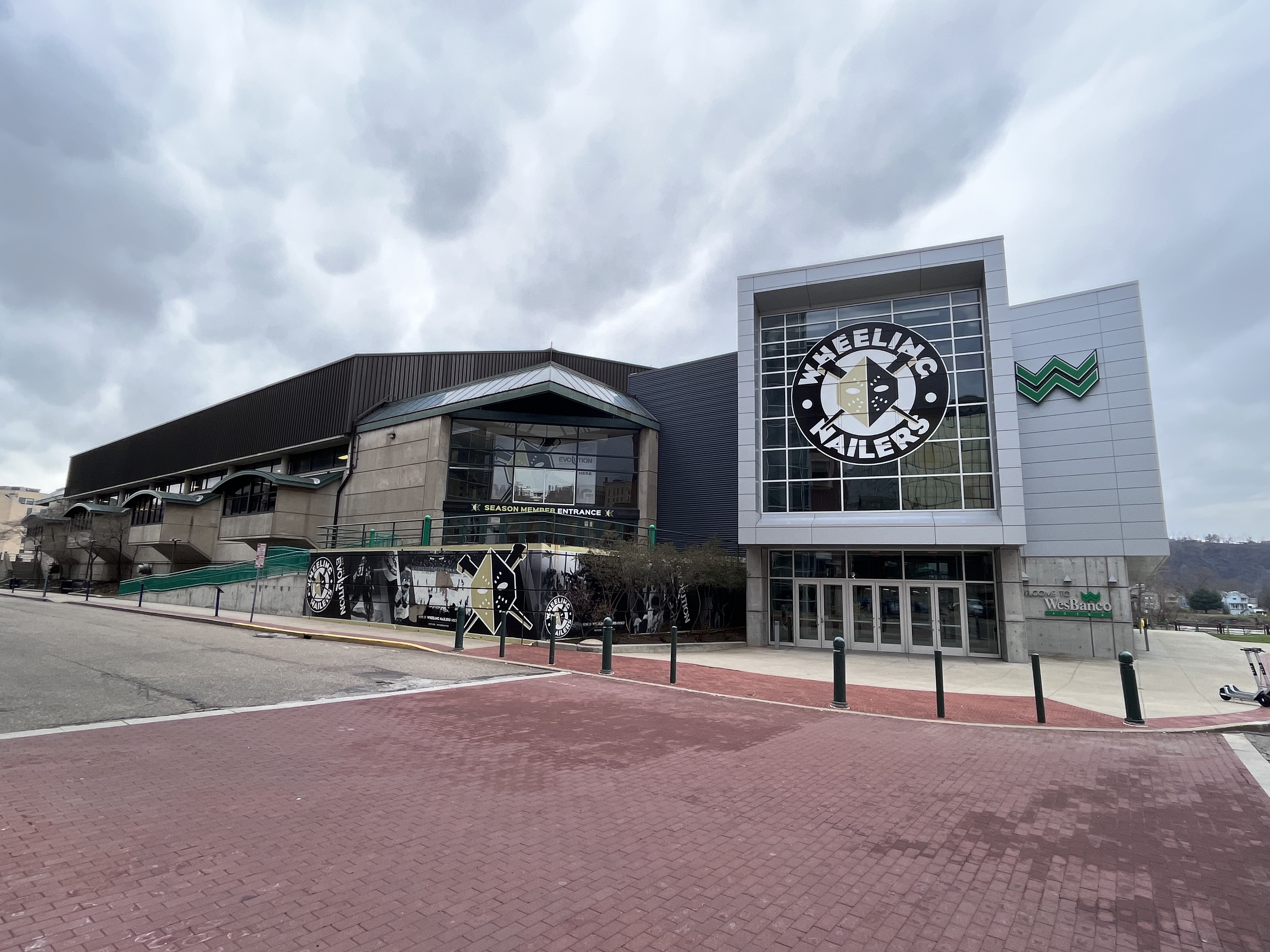
WesBanco Arena

Wheeling, known as Nail City, is home to the Wheeling Nailers hockey team and the Wheeling Miners football. The Nailers play in the WesBanco Arena (formerly the Wheeling Civic Center), and are part of the North division of the Eastern Conference of the ECHL. The Miners are in the National Arena League. Formerly home to the Ohio Valley Greyhounds, Wheeling became home to a second team in 2009. The team, known as the Wheeling Wildcats, played in the Continental Indoor Football League but folded after the 2009 season. High school football and soccer are played at Wheeling Island Stadium.

Wheeling is also home to the Mountain East Conference basketball championship tournament, an NCAA Division II conference that launched in the 2013–14 school year. Wheeling University and West Liberty are both charter members of the new conference, an offshoot of the now-disbanded West Virginia Intercollegiate Athletic Conference.

== Parks and recreation ==
Oglebay Park

Wheeling features several municipal parks, including Oglebay Park and Wheeling Park. Oglebay Park incorporates five golf courses, a public swimming pool, the Oglebay Mansion, and other recreational activities. Within the park is the Good Zoo, the only Association of Zoos and Aquariums accredited zoo in West Virginia. Ohio County has six golf courses, including designs by renowned golfer Arnold Palmer and architect Robert Trent Jones.

Wheeling is the home of Wheeling Island Hotel-Casino-Racetrack, located on Wheeling Island. Formerly known as Wheeling Downs, the facility features live greyhound racing, slots, poker games, and casino-style table games. Ohio County held a special election on June 9, 2007, to approve the legalization of table games.

In October 2007, Wheeling opened the state's first concrete skateboard park. The 12,000-square-foot (1,100 m^{2}) facility was designed and built by world-renowned skatepark builder Grindline, of Seattle, Washington. The park consists of 60% bowls and 40% street elements; it is located within the Chambers Ballfield Complex in the Elm Grove section of the city. An addition to the street section of the park was completed by Grindline in November 2009. A covered shelter, restrooms, and webcam are installed. The park is lighted and open 24/7.

== Government ==
United States District Court for the Northern District of West Virginia

Under West Virginia law, cities may adopt a form of government called the manager-mayor plan, under which Wheeling operates. The elected mayor presides over meetings of the Wheeling City Council, which has six members elected from geographic wards. Council members serve four-year terms. The city council also confirms executive nominations for members to various boards, which have limited regulatory authority, including the Planning Commission, the Board of Zoning Appeals, and the Traffic Commission. The city manager serves as chief executive and administrative officer for the city.

The current mayor of Wheeling is Denny Magruder, and the current city manager is Robert Herron. The current members of the City Council are Tony Assarro (1st Ward), Ben Seidler (2nd Ward), Connie Cain (3rd Ward), Vice-Mayor Jerry Sklavounakis (4th Ward), Ty Thorngate (5th Ward), and Dave Palmer (6th Ward). City elections were held on May 14, 2024, and the current term began on July 1, 2024. City elections will be held again on May 14, 2028.

List of mayors of Wheeling, West Virginia

Name	Portrait	Term start	Term end
George Miller		1806	1807
Moses Chapline		1807	1809
William Irwin		1809	1810
Noah Linsly		1810	1814
William Irwin		March 1814	September 1814
George Knox		1815	1816
William Irwin		1816	1817
Peter Yarnall		1817	1819
Moses Chapline		1819	1824
Z. Jacobs		1824	1828
Samuel Sprigg		March 1828	September 1828
John McLure		September 1828	March 1830
Moses W. Chapline		1830	1834
Z. Jacobs		1834	1836
Moses W. Chapline		May 1836	January 1840
George Dulty		January 1840	January 1846
Moses C. Good		January 1846	January 1847
William W. Shriver		January 1847	June 1848
Sobieski Brady		June 1848	January 1850
Alfred Caldwell		January 1850	January 1852
Morgan Nelson		January 1852	January 1853
Sobieski Brady		January 1853	January 1855
James Paull		January 1855	January 1856
Alfred Caldwell		January 1856	January 1858
James Tanner		January 1858	January 1859
Andrew Wilson		January 1859	January 1861
Andrew J. Sweeney		January 1861	January 1863
George Baird		January 1863	January 1864
Henry Crangle		January 1864	January 1865
Andrew J. Sweeney		January 1865	January 1868
Sobieski Brady		January 1868	January 1869
Samuel McClellan Jr.		January 1869	January 1871
George W. Jeffers		January 1871	January 1875
Andrew J. Sweeney		January 1875	January 1881
Alfred Egerter		January 1881	January 1883
Jeremiah A. Miller		January 1883	January 1885
Jacob W. Grubb		January 1885	January 1887
Charles W. Seabright		January 1887	January 1893
Benjamin F. Caldwell		January 1893	January 1897
John R. Butts		January 1897	January 1899
Andrew T. Sweeney		January 1899	1905
Charles C. Schmidt		1905	August 1912 (died in office)
William O. Alexander (acting mayor)		August 1912	1912
Harvey L. Kirk		October 1912	1917
Clifford M. Vester		1917	1918
Thomas F. Thoner		1919	1925
William J. Steen		1925	1928
Thomas Y. Beckett		1929	1932
Gordon P. Fought		1932	1934
Charles F. Schultze		May 1935 (died in office)	1938
John J. Mathison		May 1938	1943
Russell S. Goodwin		1943	1947
Carl G. Bachmann		1947	1951
Charles J. Schuck		1951	1955
Jack R. Adams		1955	1959
John J. Gast		1959	1963
Charles L. Ihlenfeld		1964	1967
James L. Rogers		1967	1971
James J. Haranzo		1971	1975
John E. Fahey		1975	1979
Cuyler E. Ewing		1979	1981
William H. Muegge		1981	1984
John W. Lipphardt		1984	1985
Stella C. Koerner		1985	1988
Thomas J. Baller		1988	1992
John W. Lipphardt		1992	2000
Nicholas A. Sparachane		2000	2008
Andy McKenzie		2008	2016
Glenn F. Elliott, Jr.		2016	2024
Denny Magruder		2024	

=== City flag ===
City of Wheeling flag as of September 2018

The current flag for the city was adopted on September 4, 2018, in conjunction with the celebration of the city's 250th anniversary the following year. Its design and symbolism are credited to the Wheeling Committee on Retention and the Wheeling 250 subcommittee.

The flag features two horizontal blue bars to represent Wheeling Creek and the Ohio River, with a white bar in between. The three bars also symbolize the three major modes of transportation found in Wheeling history: river, road, and rail. Representing five distinct eras of Wheeling history, five stars are centered in a row in the white bar: the Indigenous Star, the Frontier Star, the Transportation Star, the Statehood Star, and the Industrial Star.

== Education ==
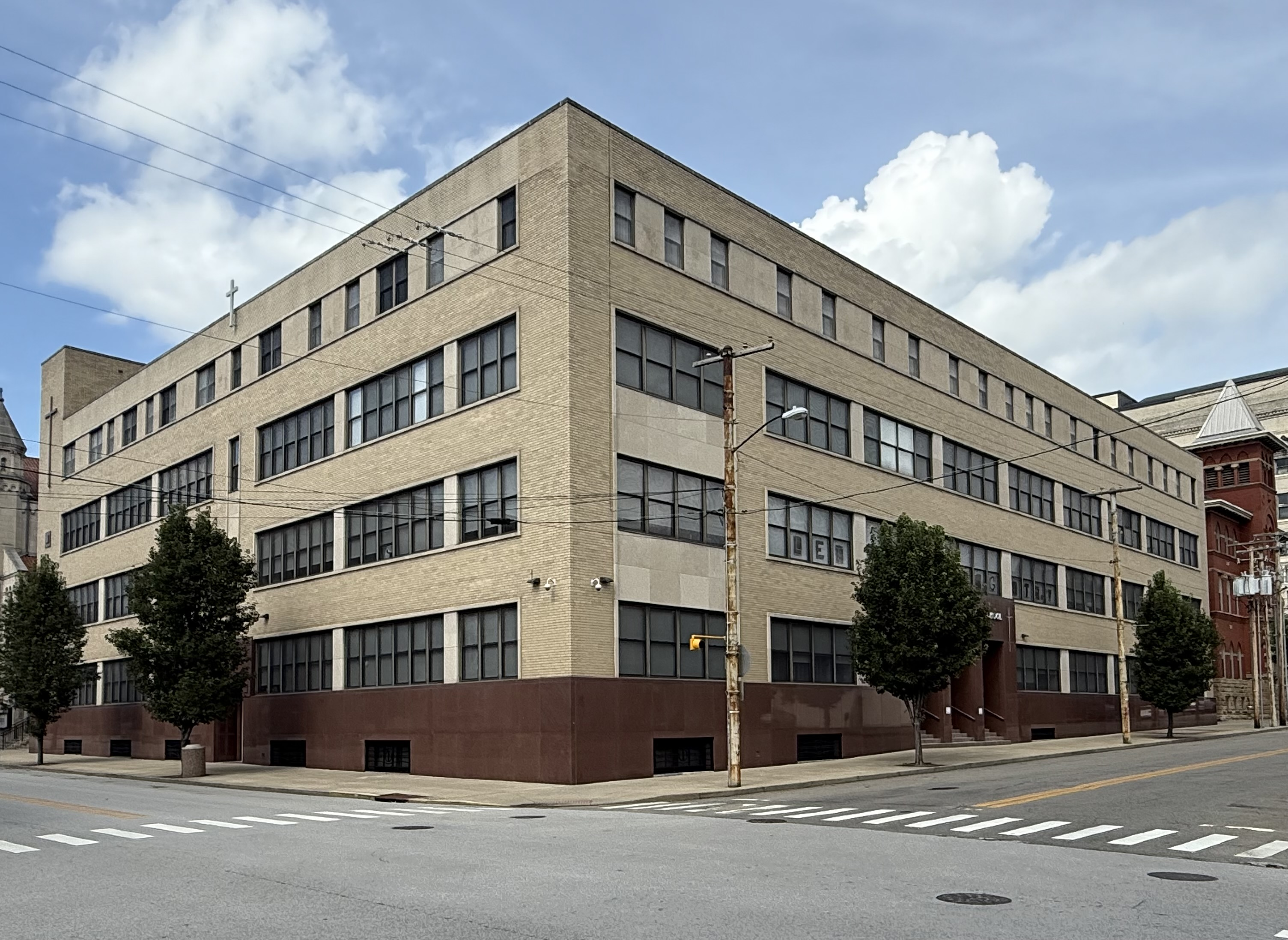
Wheeling Central Catholic High School

=== Primary and secondary ===
As elsewhere in West Virginia, K–12 schools are organized at the county level of government. The public school system, Ohio County Schools, consists of 14 schools: nine elementary schools; four middle schools, which include Triadelphia Middle, nominated for the blue ribbon school award; and the nationally recognized Wheeling Park High School. Several parochial and private schools, including Wheeling Central Catholic High School, the Linsly School, and Wheeling Country Day School are located in the city.

=== Postsecondary ===
Wheeling is the hub of higher education in the Northern Panhandle of West Virginia. Wheeling University, a private university and the only Catholic college in the state of West Virginia, is located here.

The main campus of West Virginia Northern Community College has recently been expanding with centers in downtown Wheeling; it focuses on job training and community development. Also located in close proximity to the city are West Liberty University (formerly West Liberty State College), a four-year university, and private Bethany College.

== Media ==
Located close to Pittsburgh, Wheeling is heavily influenced by its broadcast media outlets, which are easily received in the area. Besides broadcast stations, Wheeling's cable providers carry AT&T SportsNet Pittsburgh and the Pittsburgh-centric news/talk channel PCNC as its "home" sports and information sources.

In addition to the Pittsburgh outlets, the Wheeling television market is served by ABC/CBS affiliate WTRF-TV Channel 7, PBS member station W30CO-D Channel 30, and NBC/FOX affiliate WTOV-TV Channel 9 in nearby Steubenville, Ohio. Cable television provider Comcast serves the city, parts of which Centre TV also services.

Wheeling is home to WWVA 1170 AM, the state's only 50,000-watt AM station, which can be heard throughout the East Coast at night. WVLY 1370 AM and WKKX 1600 AM provide local news, sports, and talk. On the FM dial, WVKF 95.7, WKWK 97.3, WOVK 98.7, and WEGW 107.5 provide the area with various music genres. The Wheeling area is the home of WDUQ-LP, a listener-supported commercial-free station, which also serves as the local Pacifica affiliate. Pittsburgh's radio stations provide Wheeling with coverage. Several translators and repeater stations provide NPR and American Family Radio networks. Wheeling also has a student-run radio station, WPHP 91.9, operated by Wheeling Park High School students. WPHP plays top 40 songs and also covers all of the Wheeling Park Patriots' football and basketball games.

The city is home to The Intelligencer and the Wheeling News-Register newspapers, owned by Wheeling-based Ogden Newspapers Inc. The Intelligencer is published weekday mornings and Saturdays, while the News-Register is published weekday afternoons and Sundays. The Times-Leader of Martins Ferry, Ohio, another Ogden Newspapers Inc. paper, also covers Wheeling issues. In Wheeling magazine is published quarterly and covers society and events in the city. Two local websites, Weelunk and Dateline: Wheeling, serve as independent news sources for the city.

== Transportation ==
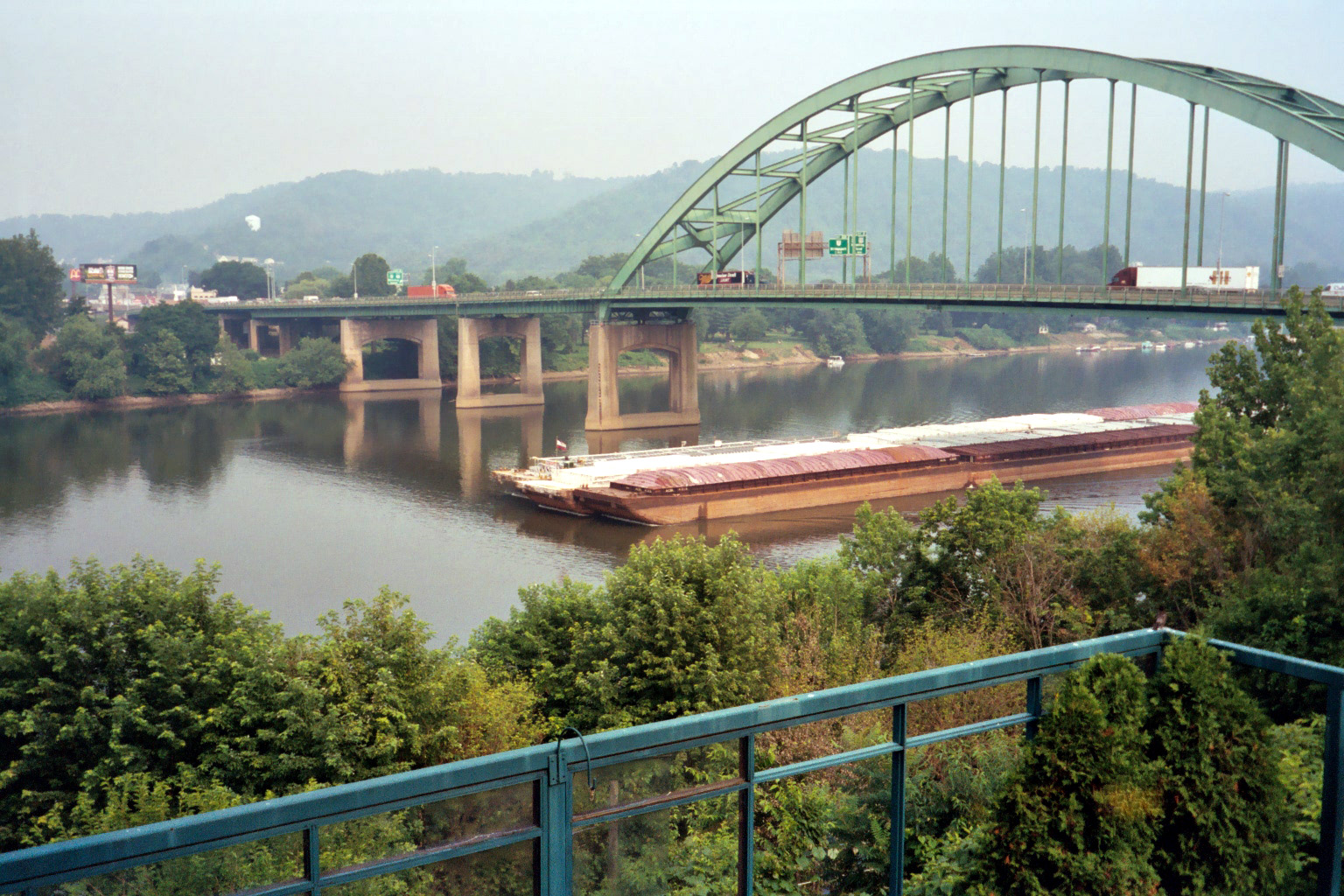
The Fort Henry Bridge carries I-70, US 40, and US 250 across the Ohio River in Wheeling.

=== Roads and bridges ===
Interstate 70 and its spur Interstate 470 run through the city east–west and link it with suburban Pittsburgh, Pennsylvania, to the east and Ohio to the west. U.S. Route 40/National Road links downtown with residential neighborhoods to the east. West Virginia Route 2 connects Wheeling with Moundsville to the south and Weirton to the north. U.S. Route 250 also runs through the city.

The Fort Henry Bridge and Vietnam Veterans Memorial Bridge carry I-70 and I-470, respectively, over the Ohio River. The historic Wheeling Suspension Bridge, completed in 1849, which was part of National Road, connects downtown and Wheeling Island; currently it is closed for safety reasons, by order of the state highway department, to vehicular traffic. I-70 passes under Wheeling Hill through the Wheeling Tunnel.

=== Bus ===
Bus transportation to points throughout North America is available from Wheeling through Greyhound Lines. The bus terminal, the Robert C. Byrd Intermodal Transportation Center, was built with $11.1 million in federal funds.

The East Ohio Authority and the Ohio Valley Regional Transit Authority (OVRTA), which share the Intermodal Transportation Center as the hub for hub-and-spoke routes, provide regional transportation through West Virginia and Eastern Ohio.

Wheeling operated streetcars from the 1880s until 1943 under the Wheeling Traction Company and Co-operative Transit Company. Buses replaced streetcar operations due to operating costs.

=== Air ===
The city is served by the Wheeling Ohio County Airport for general aviation and by Pittsburgh International Airport for passenger service.

== Popular culture ==
- The second track in the video game Freekstyle takes place in Wheeling.
- The majority of the film The Gun on Second Street was shot in Wheeling.

== See also ==
- List of cities and towns along the Ohio River
