= Russell House =

Russell House may refer to:

== Canada ==
- Russell House (Ottawa), a historic former hotel in Ottawa, Ontario

== United States ==
(by state then city)

- Russell Family Historic District, Alexander City, Alabama
- John Russell House, Fordyce, Arkansas
- Russell House (Pine Bluff, Arkansas), formerly
- Russell-Williamson House, Yuma, Arizona, listed on the NRHP in Yuma County
- Russell-Graves House, Arvada, Colorado, listed on the NRHP in Jefferson County
- Edward Augustus Russell House, Middletown, Connecticut, at Wesleyan University in Middlesex County
- Samuel Wadsworth Russell House, Middletown, Connecticut, a National Historic Landmark
- William Russell House (Lewes, Delaware)
- Judge Willis Russell House, Brooksville, Florida
- Russell Homeplace Historic District, Russell, Georgia, listed on the NRHP in Barrow County
- Rensselaer Russell House, Waterloo, Iowa
- Horn-Vincent-Russell Estate, Mission Hills, Kansas
- Russell Court, La Grange, Kentucky
- Russell House (Andover, Massachusetts)
- Jason Russell House, Arlington, Massachusetts
- Bartlett-Russell-Hedge House, Plymouth, Massachusetts
- Philemon Russell House, Somerville, Massachusetts
- Susan Russell House, Somerville, Massachusetts
- The Russell (Worcester, Massachusetts)
- Arthur H. Russell House, Winchester, Massachusetts
- Charles Russell House (Winchester, Massachusetts)
- William Russell House (Crystal Falls, Michigan)
- The Russell (Detroit, Michigan)
- Williamson-Russell-Rahilly House, Lake City, Minnesota
- Russell's House at Corinthn, Mississippi, salient in the Civil War battle of the Siege of Corinthn
- Charlie and Nancy Russell Honeymoon Cabin, Cascade, Montana, listed on the NRHP in Cascade County
- Charles M. Russell House and Studio, Great Falls, Montana
- Russell-Colbath House, Albany, New Hampshire
- Charles B. Russell House, Cincinnati, Ohio
- Mark Russell House, Riverlea, Ohio, listed on the NRHP in Franklin County
- Russell House (Bedford, Pennsylvania)
- Joseph and William Russell House, in Providence, Rhode Island
- Nathaniel Russell House, Charleston, South Carolina
- Russell House (Mountain Rest, South Carolina)
- Evans-Russell House, Spartanburg, South Carolina
- Russell-Heath House, Stoneboro, SC
- Avery Russell House, Farragut, Tennessee
- Russell House (Springfield, Tennessee)
- Russell-Lackey-Prater House, Louisville, Tennessee, listed on the NRHP in Blount County
- Russell-Arnold House, Lufkin, Texas, listed on the NRHP in Angelina County
- Russell House (South Bend, Washington), listed on the NRHP in Pacific County
- Charles W. Russell House, Wheeling, West Virginia

== See also ==
- The Russell (disambiguation)
- Charles Russell House (disambiguation)
- William Russell House (disambiguation)
- Russell School (disambiguation)
