= Charles Russell House =

Charles Russell House may refer to:

in the United States

(by state then city)

- Charles Russell House (Winchester, Massachusetts), listed on the National Register of Historic Places (NRHP)
- Charlie and Nancy Russell Honeymoon Cabin, Cascade MT, listed on the NRHP in Montana
- Charles M. Russell House and Studio, Great Falls, Montana, listed on the NRHP
- Charles B. Russell House, Cincinnati OH, listed on the NRHP
- Charles W. Russell House, Wheeling, West Virginia, listed on the NRHP

== See also ==
- Russell House (disambiguation)
