= William Russell House =

William Russell House may refer to:

- William Russell House (Lewes, Delaware), listed on the NRHP in Delaware
- William Russell House, in Crystal Falls, Michigan, listed on the NRHP in Iron County, Michigan
- Joseph and William Russell House, in Providence, Rhode Island, listed on the NRHP in Rhode Island

== See also ==
- Russell House (disambiguation)
