= Russell High School =

Russell High School may refer to:

In Canada:

- Russell High School (Ontario) Russell, Ontario

In the South Africa:

- Russell High School (Pietermaritzburg), Pietermaritzburg, KwaZulu-Natal

In the United States:

- Russell High School (Kansas) in Russell, Kansas: Russell County Unified School District 407
- Russell High School (Kentucky), physically located in Flatwoods, Kentucky, but with a postal address of Russell, Kentucky
- Russell High School (East Point, Georgia), a former high school in East Point, Georgia

== See also ==
- Russell School (disambiguation)
