= Cerone =

Cerone is a surname. Notable people with the surname include:

- Daniel Cerone, American script writer
- David Cerone, American musician and teacher
- Jackie Cerone (1914–1996), American mobster
- Pietro Cerone (1566–1625), Italian music theorist
- Rick Cerone (born 1954), American baseball player

== See also ==
- Cerrone (Marc, born 1951), French musician
- Cerrone (disambiguation)
