= The Russell =

The Russell may refer to:

- The Russell (Worcester, Massachusetts), listed on the National Register of Historic Places
- The Russell (Detroit, Michigan)

== See also ==
- Russell House (disambiguation)
