= L. S. Good House =

Historic house in West Virginia, United States

- U.S. National Register of Historic Places
- U.S. Historic district – Contributing property
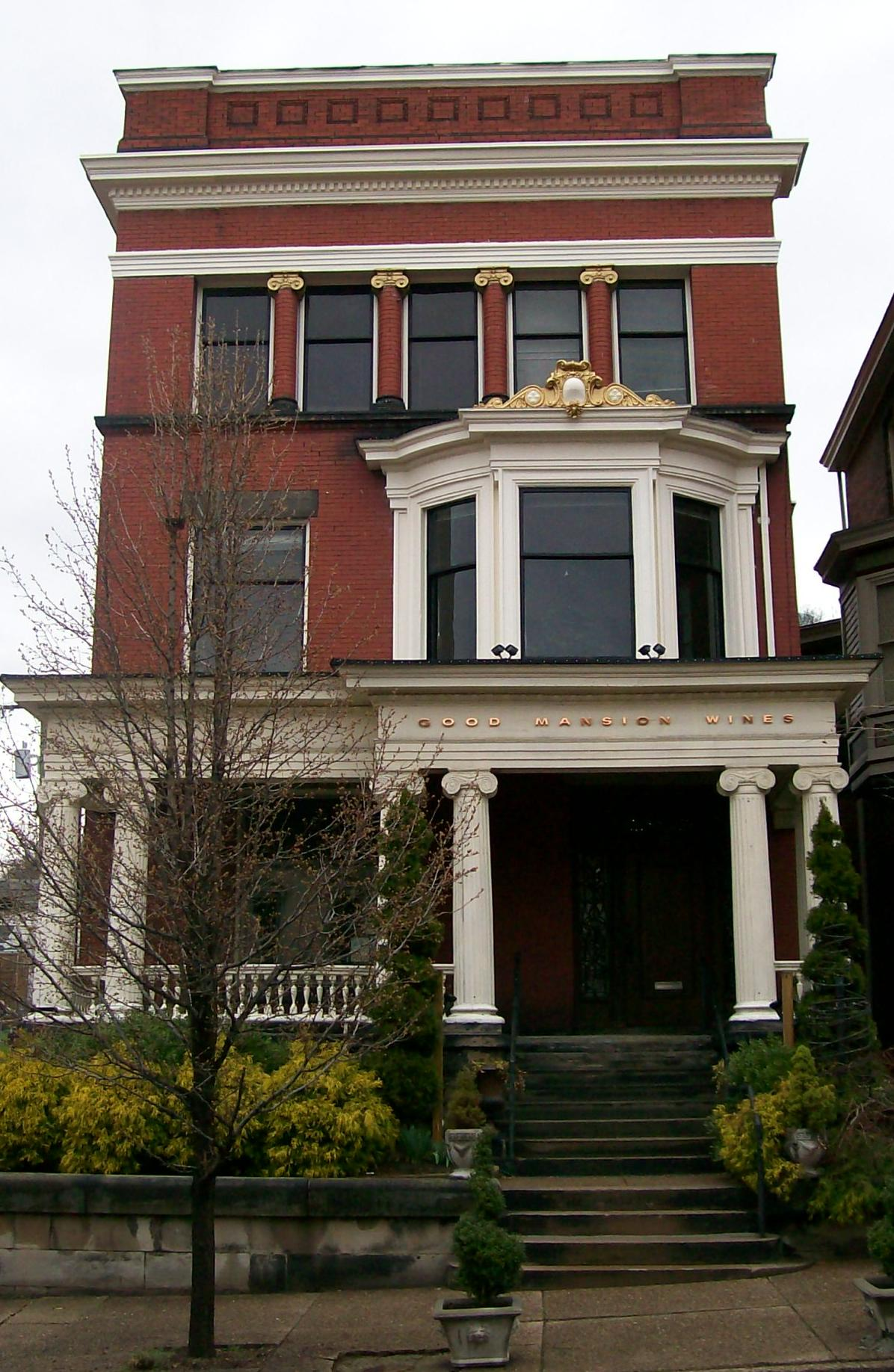
- L. S. Good House, March 2010

- Location within West Virginia Location within the United States
- Location: 95 14th St., Wheeling, West Virginia
- Coordinates: 40°3′59″N 80°43′2″W
- Area: less than one acre
- Built: 1904
- Architect: Millard F. Giesey
- Architectural style: Classical Revival
- NRHP reference No.: 88002667
- Added to NRHP: November 28, 1988

The L. S. Good House or Good Mansion is a historic home located in Wheeling, West Virginia, United States. It was built in 1904 and was placed in the National Register singularly on November 28, 1988, and as part of the East Wheeling Historic District on November 22, 1999.

== History ==
=== L. S. Good ===
Lippmann Gut was born in Gailingen am Hochrhein, Germany, in 1855 to German speaking Jewish parents. He emigrated to America in 1873 at the age of eighteen. He arrived in Galveston, Texas with no possessions or funds. Shortly after arriving he changed his name to Lee Samuel Good to sound more native. He moved to Wheeling (it is claimed he walked there), where he opened a business, and became a naturalized citizen in 1879. His business sold imported and domestic dry goods, oils, fabrics and carpets. The store was located on Main Street in the Cotton Building but moved further down Main Street after the turn of the century.

Good married Fannie Rothchild in 1889. They had three children.

=== The house ===
He built his new house on 14th Street in 1904 at a cost of $7,000 in the midst of his new fortune. Good employed Millard F. Giesey, a Wheeling architect to construct his lavish residence. Giesey had already established his name in Wheeling in the later years of the 19th Century with architect Edward B. Franzheim and constructed a wide variety of buildings and homes stretching across a wide portion of West Virginia.

The home was completed in 1905 and Good spent another 22 years in residence until his death in 1927. During those years he would entertain his employees with parties at his home and donated freely though anonymously as he wanted the donations to be discreet. Wheeling Park received most of his charity and its twin man-made lakes are credited to Good's funding. When Good died nearly every store in Wheeling closed for his funeral out of respect for the prominent city leader.

The house passed to one of Good's sons, Samuel Lee Good, who continued his father's charity work and served on the Wheeling Park Commission from 1933 to 1972. Another son, Sidney, directed his father's business. Samuel lived in the house until 1920.

The house is currently owned by Dominick Cerrone, who operates Good Mansion Wines out of the historic home.

== Appearance ==
The Good Mansion is a three-story Classical Revival style brick townhouse. It features a full-width porch with pairs and clusters of fluted wooden columns on sandstone plinths. The third story facade has an engaged Ionic order brick colonnade. It has a sumptuous interior.
