= Willard Richmond Apartment Block =

- U.S. National Register of Historic Places
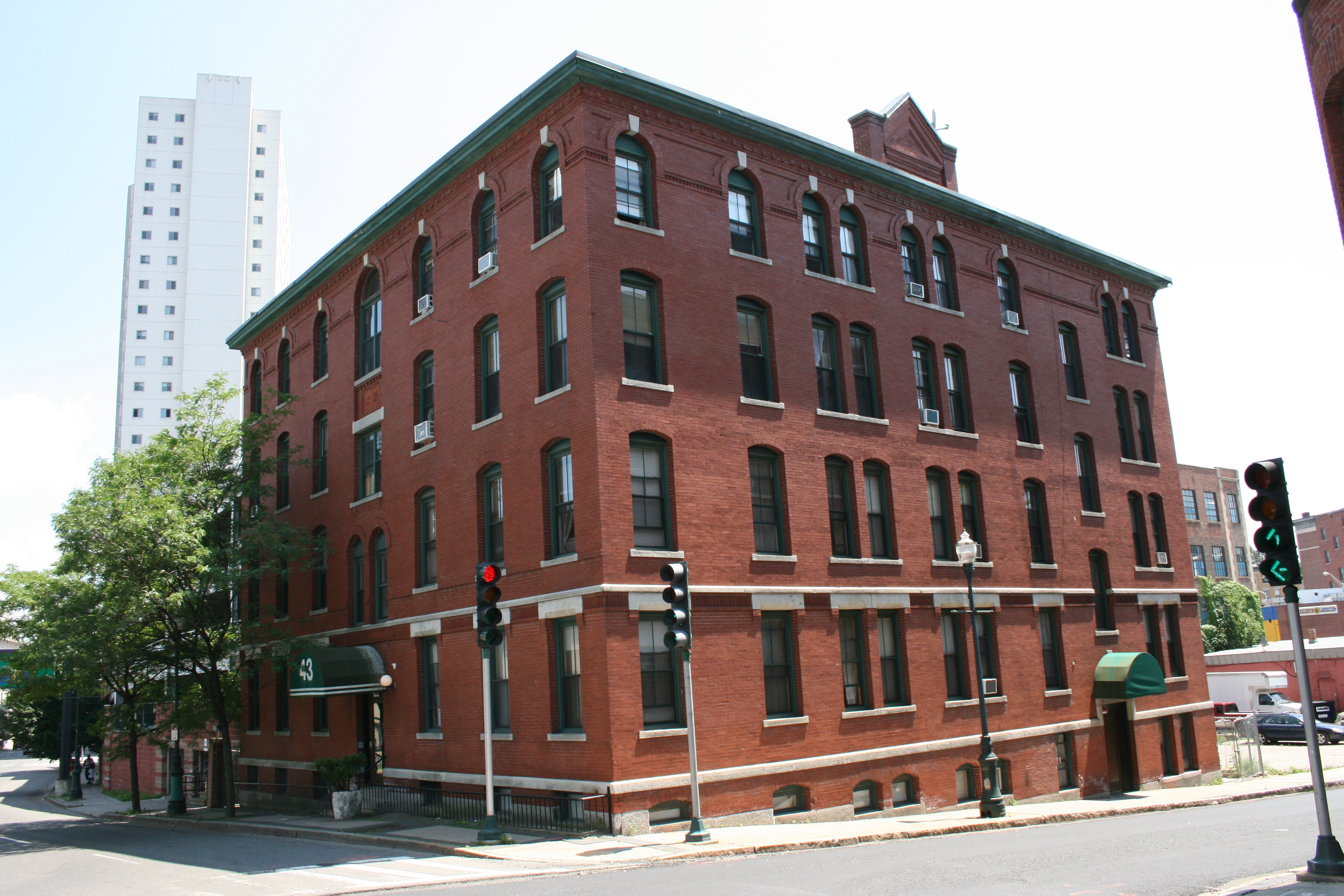

- Location within Massachusetts Location within the United States
- Location: 43 Austin St., Worcester, Massachusetts
- Coordinates: 42°15′38″N 71°48′24″W
- MPS: Worcester MRA
- NRHP reference No.: 85002783
- Added to NRHP: November 7, 1985

The Willard Richmond Apartment Block is an historic apartment house at 43 Austin Street in Worcester, Massachusetts. Built sometime between 1879 and 1886, it is one of the first apartment blocks built in the Main-Wellington-Chandler area, which had one of the city's highest concentrations of such buildings by 1900. The building was listed on the National Register of Historic Places in 1985.

== Description and history ==
The Willard Richmond Apartment Block stands on the southeast corner of Austin and Irving Streets, a short way southwest of Worcester's central downtown area. It is a four-story brick structure, with granite trim. It is basically a mostly rectangular L shape, with a corner missing at the southeast of the building. The street-facing facades have a stringcourse of granite between the partially-exposed basement and the first floor, with another above the first floor window lintels. First floor windows are set in square openings, while those on the second and third floors are set in segmented-arch openings. The fourth floor windows are set in round-arch openings with brick headers and granite keystones, with a band of corbelled brickwork joining the windows at the base of the arched portion. Windows above the main and secondary entrances are treated differently: those above the secondary (Irving Street) entrance have segmented-arch openings. On the second-level above the main entrance are two round-arch windows, with a rectangular one above them, separated by a decorative panel from a large round-arch window at the top.

The building was built sometime between 1879 and 1886, and was one of the earliest buildings in what became, by 1900, one of the city's largest apartment house districts, the Main-Wellington-Chandler area. This area, convenient to downtown Worcester, experienced rapid growth in the 1880s and 1890s. Many of its apartment blocks have since been torn down, and this is one of a few surviving remnants of that past.

== See also ==
- The Russell (Worcester, Massachusetts), located directly across Irving Street
- National Register of Historic Places listings in northwestern Worcester, Massachusetts
- National Register of Historic Places listings in Worcester County, Massachusetts
