= Cathedral of Saint Joseph (Wheeling, West Virginia) =

Historic church in Wheeling, West Virginia, United States

- U.S. Historic district – Contributing property
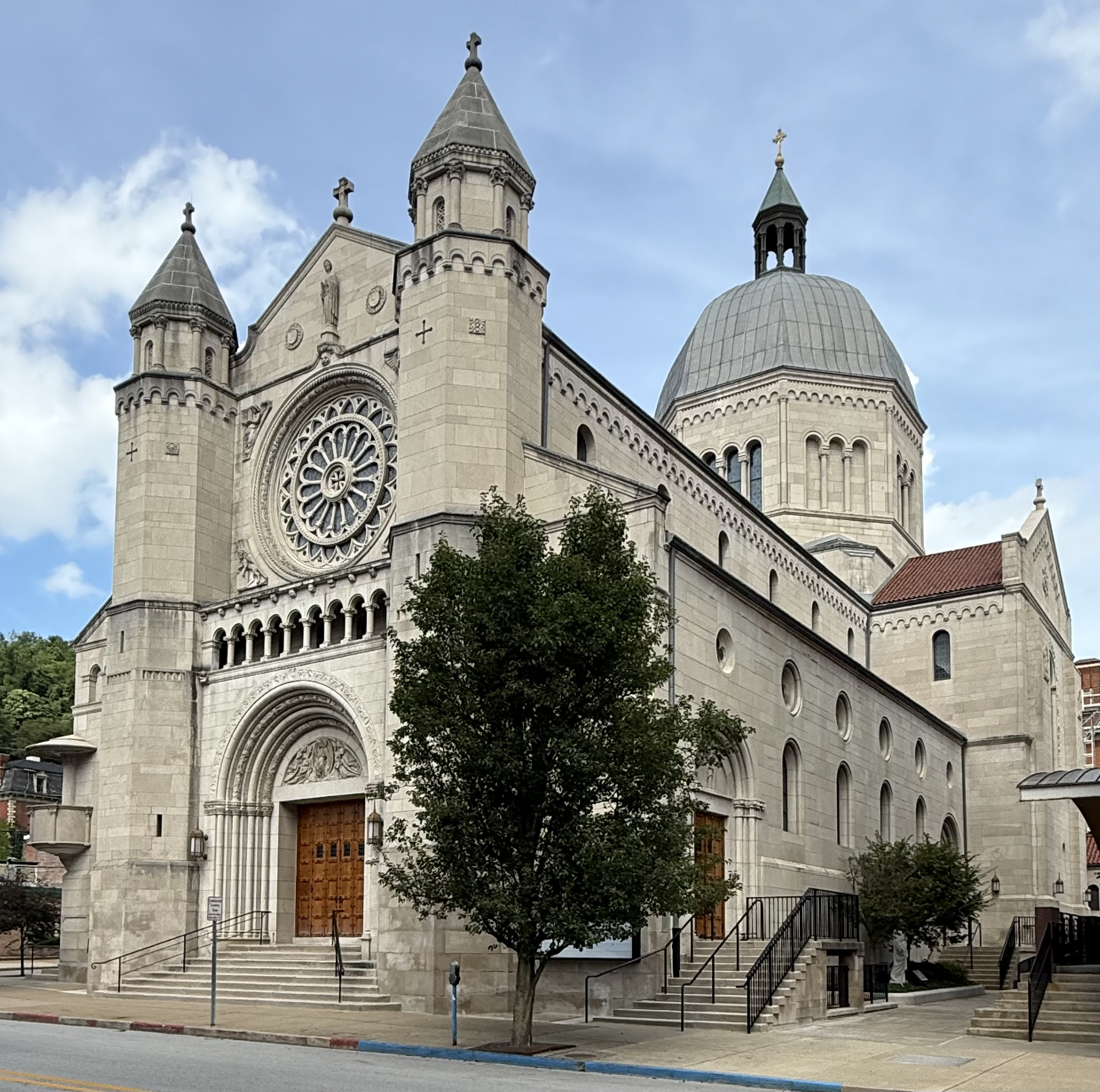
- Cathedral of St. Joseph in 2025

- Location within West Virginia
- Location: 1312 Eoff Street; Wheeling, West Virginia
- Coordinates: 40°3′59.47″N 80°43′11.82″W
- Built: 1926
- Architect: Edward J. Weber
- Architectural style: Romanesque Revival
- Part of: East Wheeling Historic District (ID99001402)
- Added to NRHP: November 22, 1999

The Cathedral of Saint Joseph of Wheeling or Saint Joseph's Cathedral is the seat of the bishop of the Catholic Diocese of Wheeling–Charleston.The cathedral is home to the oldest congregation in the city of Wheeling, West Virginia, in the United States.

The current pastor of the cathedral is the bishop of the Diocese of Wheeling-Charleston, the Most Reverend Evelio Menjivar-Ayala. The current rector is Father Penumaka "Pen" Manikyalarao and the vice-rector is Father Clifton Mastran.

== History ==
=== Saint James the Apostle Church ===
During the first half of the 19th century, Wheeling was part of the State of Virginia and under the Catholic jurisdiction of the Diocese of Richmond. The first Catholic church in Wheeling was a small log church constructed in 1822 by the missionary Edward Fenwick for German and Irish immigrants.By 1847, the parish had constructed a larger church, Saint James the Apostle, on 13th and Eoff Street in Wheeling.

==== First Saint Joseph the Workman Cathedral ====
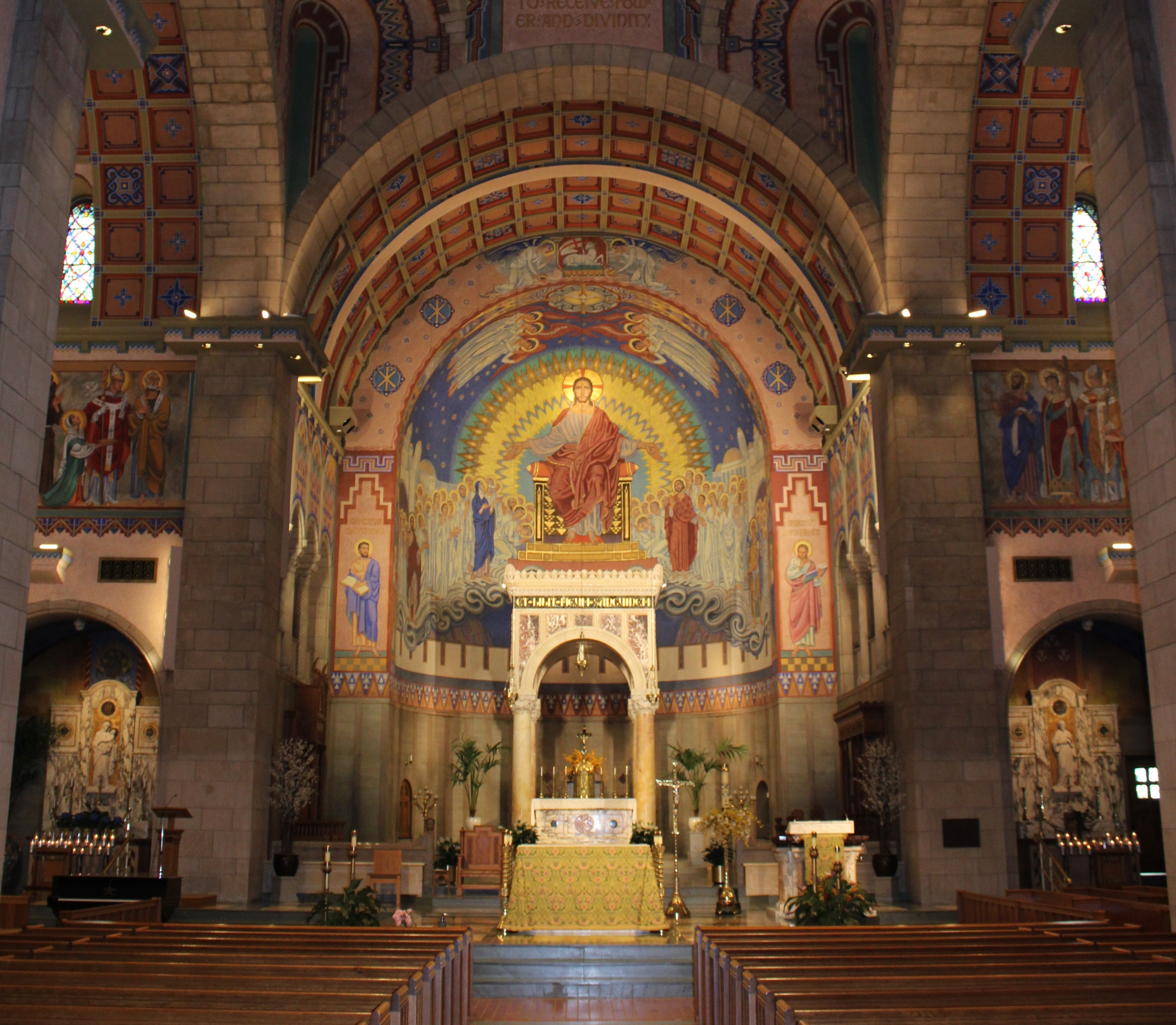
Cathedral interior (2023)

In 1850, Pope Pius IX in 1850 erected the Diocese of Wheeling and appointed Bishop Richard Vincent Whelan as its first bishop. Saint James the Apostle Church now became Saint James the Apostle Cathedral.Whelan In 1872 petititioned the Vatican to change the cathedral name to Saint Joseph the Workman. This was in recognition of the many parishioners who worked in coal mines in the region.

With after start of the American Civil War in 1861, the West Virginia area seceded from Virginia to become a separate state.After the end of World War I in 1919, Bishop Patrick Donahue began planning a new, larger cathedral to meet the diocese's changing needs. However, he died in later 1922 before he could start the project. He was succeeded by Bishop John Joseph Swint.

A fire heavily damaged the cathedral in early 1923, forcing Swint to quickly restart the new cathedral project. He hired the architect Edward J. Weber of Pittsburgh, Pennsylvania, to design the structure. He chose a Neo-Romanesque style for the cathedral. The cornerstone for the new cathedral was laid on May 5, 1923.

=== Second Saint Joseph the Workman Cathedral ===
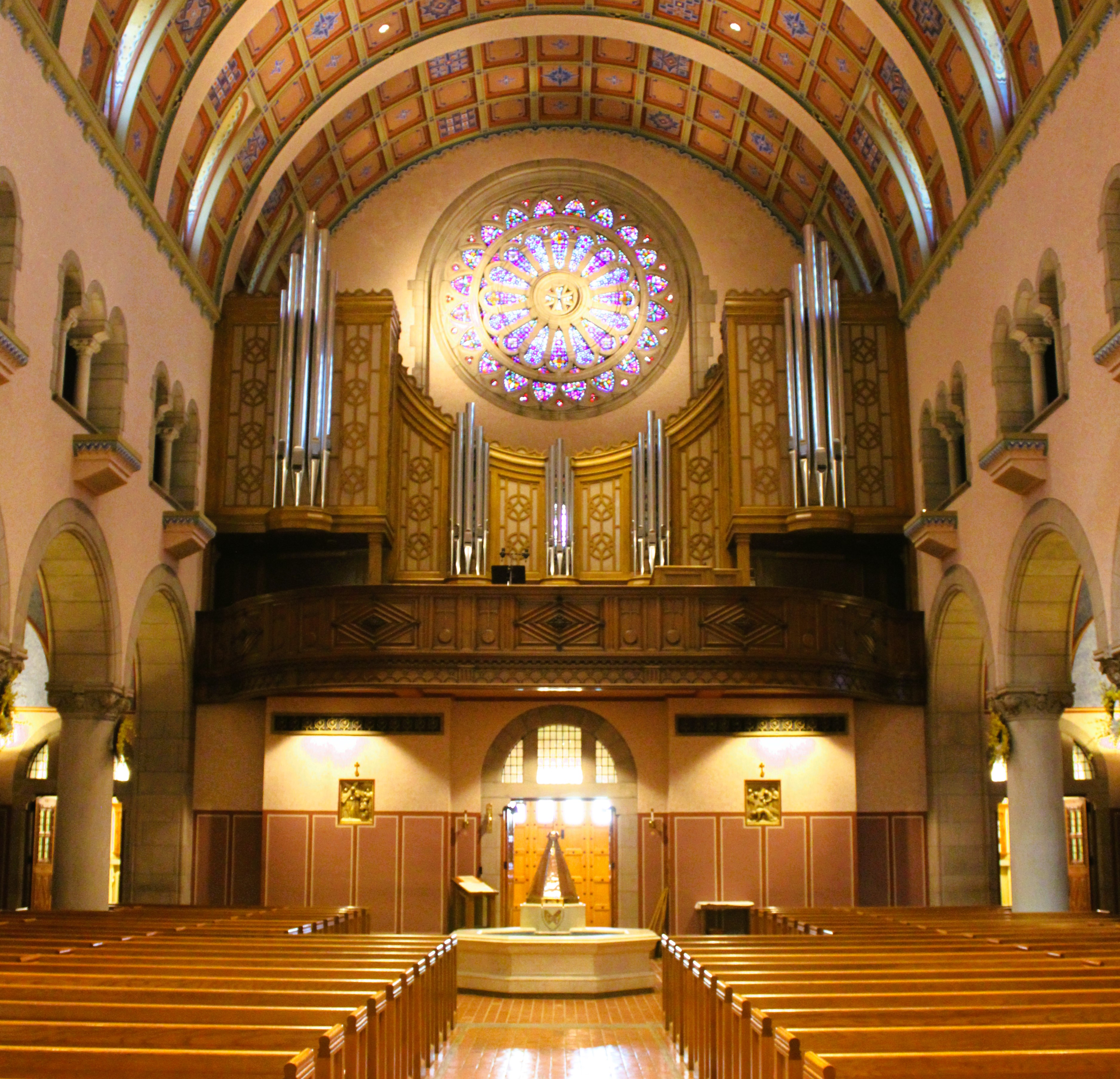
Rear gallery and pipe organ (2023)

The second Saint Joseph the Workman Cathedral was dedicated on April 21, 1926. The project cost $500,000 ( equivalent to $9,100,000 in 2025).At that time, Swint commented that he had

"planned to build not for a few years, for fifty years or a hundred years, but to erect a building that would stand for hundreds of years and be a beautiful legacy which the present congregation would bequeath to future generations" (West Virginia Register 12/30/22).

In 1973, Bishop Joseph Hodges changed the cathedral interior to comply with liturgical changes from the Second Vatican Council of the early 1960s. He moved the main altar under the cathedral dome, removed the ambo and communion rail, and reoriented the side pews to face the main altar.

During the early 1990s, Bishop Bernard W. Schmitt began a major renovation of the cathedral interior. Contractors restored the murals and paintings, added new furnishings to match the cathedral woodwork and upgraded heating, cooling, electrical, lighting, and sound systems. A new baptismal fountain was constructed and the floors were refinished. The project was completed in 1996.The diocese in 1995 merged three parishes in Wheeling into the cathedral parish. Sacred Heart , St. Joan of Arc and Blessed Trinity.In 1999, the cathedral was a contributing property to the East Wheeling Historic District on the National Register of Historic Places.

Bishop Michael J. Bransfield in 2006 started needed repair work on the cathedral roof and external windows. The stained glass windows were restored and the original cathedral was brought back. Six years lager, Bransfield installed a new marble floor, altar, and ambo and restored the pews.

In 2011, the diocese closed the cathedral school due to low enrollment and repurposed the building as a chancery. It also developed a new courtyard with a fountain, along with a garden dedicated to the Virgin Mary.

== Architecture ==
=== Rectory ===
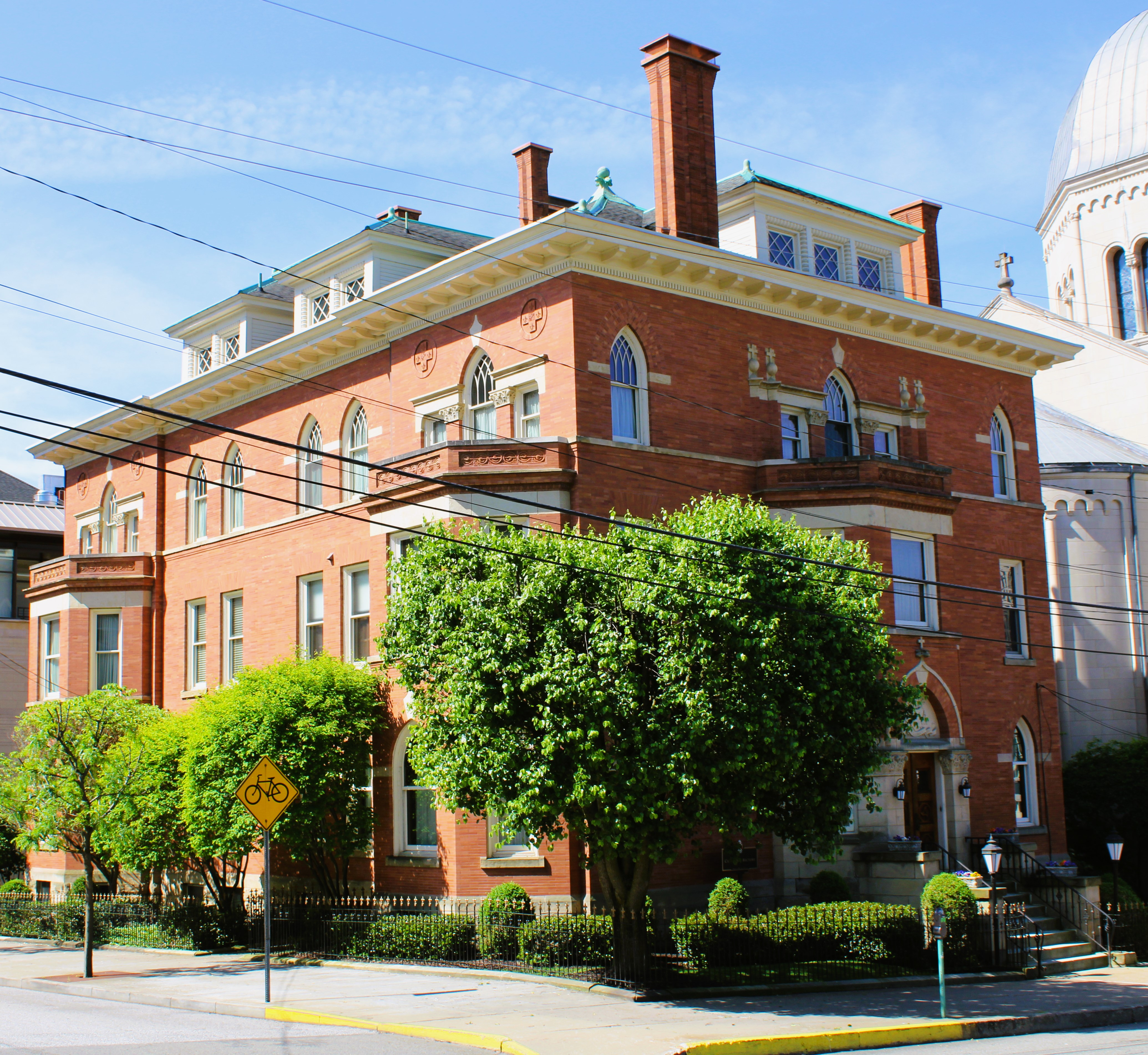
Rectory (2023)

The adjacent rectory is a three-story, five-bay house that was built in the Gothic revival style in 1920. It is a brick structure built on a stone foundation; it is capped with a mansard roof with dormers. Plain brackets are located under the eaves.

The wood-carved double entrance way to the rectory is flanked by columns that are capped with decorative stone carvings. The third floor features Gothic-arched tracery windows and a balcony with decorative stonework.

=== Cathedral interior ===
According to the architect, the colorful interior of St. Joseph was created in the Mediaeval Byzantine style. The primary dome is filled with a depiction of heaven. The mural, “Enthroned Christ and the Communion of the Saints,” which fills the half-dome of the apse, was painted by the American artist Felix B. Lieftuchter. The medieval-style stained glass was created by George W. Sotter of Philadelphia.

The long, broad nave is covered with a barrel vault decorated with colorfully painted trompe l'oeil coffers. A free-standing ciborium, another feature typical of Lombard Romanesque churches, protects the marble high altar on which the tabernacle rests.

=== Cathedral exterior ===
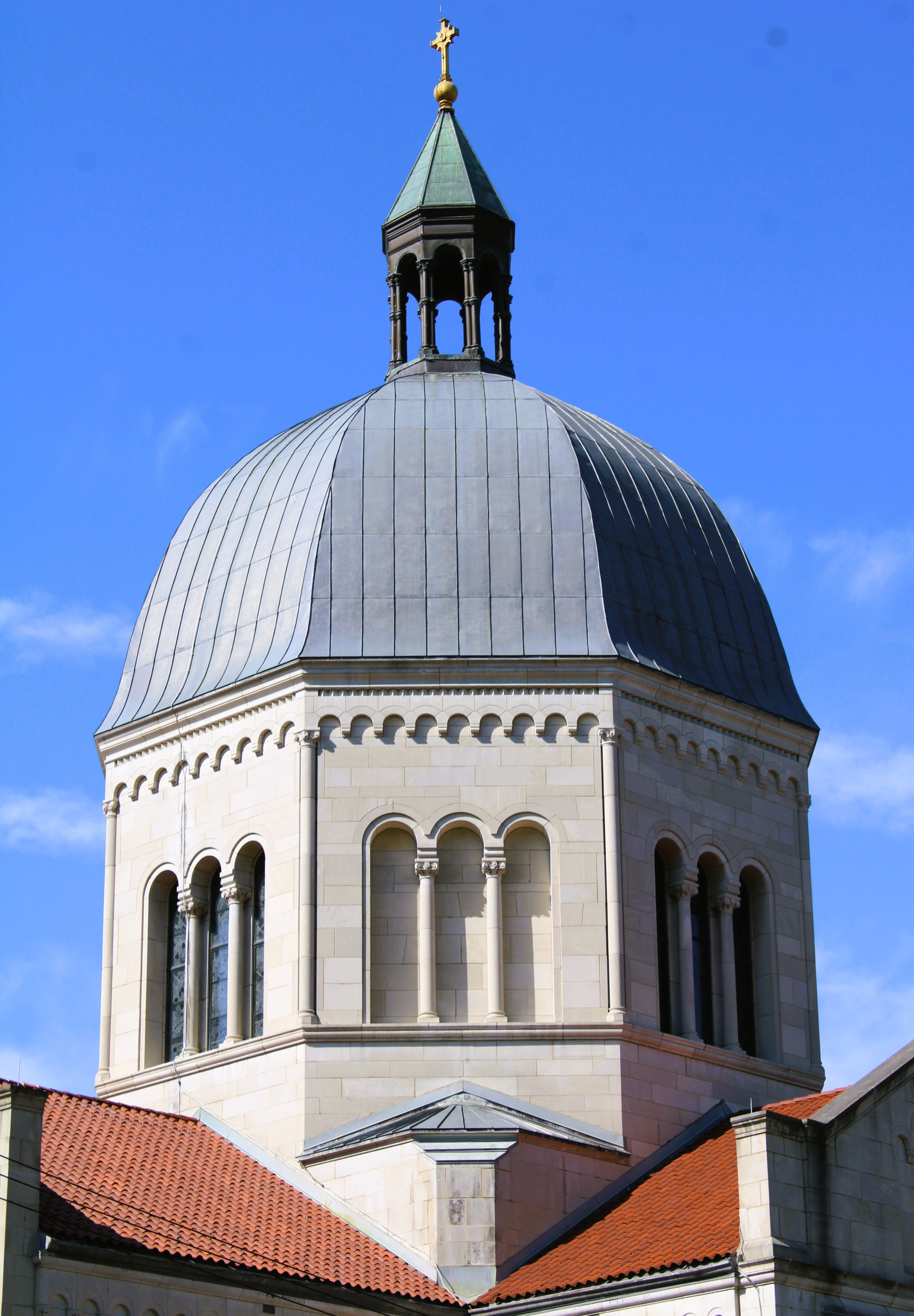
Cathedral dome (2023)

The cathedral is a Lombardi Romanesque structure with a modified basilica floor plan that is cruciform in shape. The inspiration for St. Joseph the Workman came from several churches in Italy; the Church of San Pietro in Toscanella and the Cathedral of Saint Stephen in Prato. Bishop Swint wanted the dome to be based on the dome of the cathedral of Cathedral of Santa Maria del Fiore in Florence, Italy.

St. Joseph the Workman features a dome that rises 148 feet (45 m) above the crossing. Two turrets flank a rose window on the main facade.The sculpture in the tympanum of the main doorway, depicting "Christ in Majesty", was carved by the sculptor Francis Aretz of Pittsburgh. Carved symbols of the Four Evangelists occupy quadrants around the wheel window, and a statue of St. Joseph stands above them.

The exterior pulpit and sounding board, both of stone, on the northeast corner of the facade derive from also derives from Cathedral of Saint Stephen. A belfry tower at the southeast corner, between the transept and apse, is visible from the cathedral courtyard.

Cathedral images

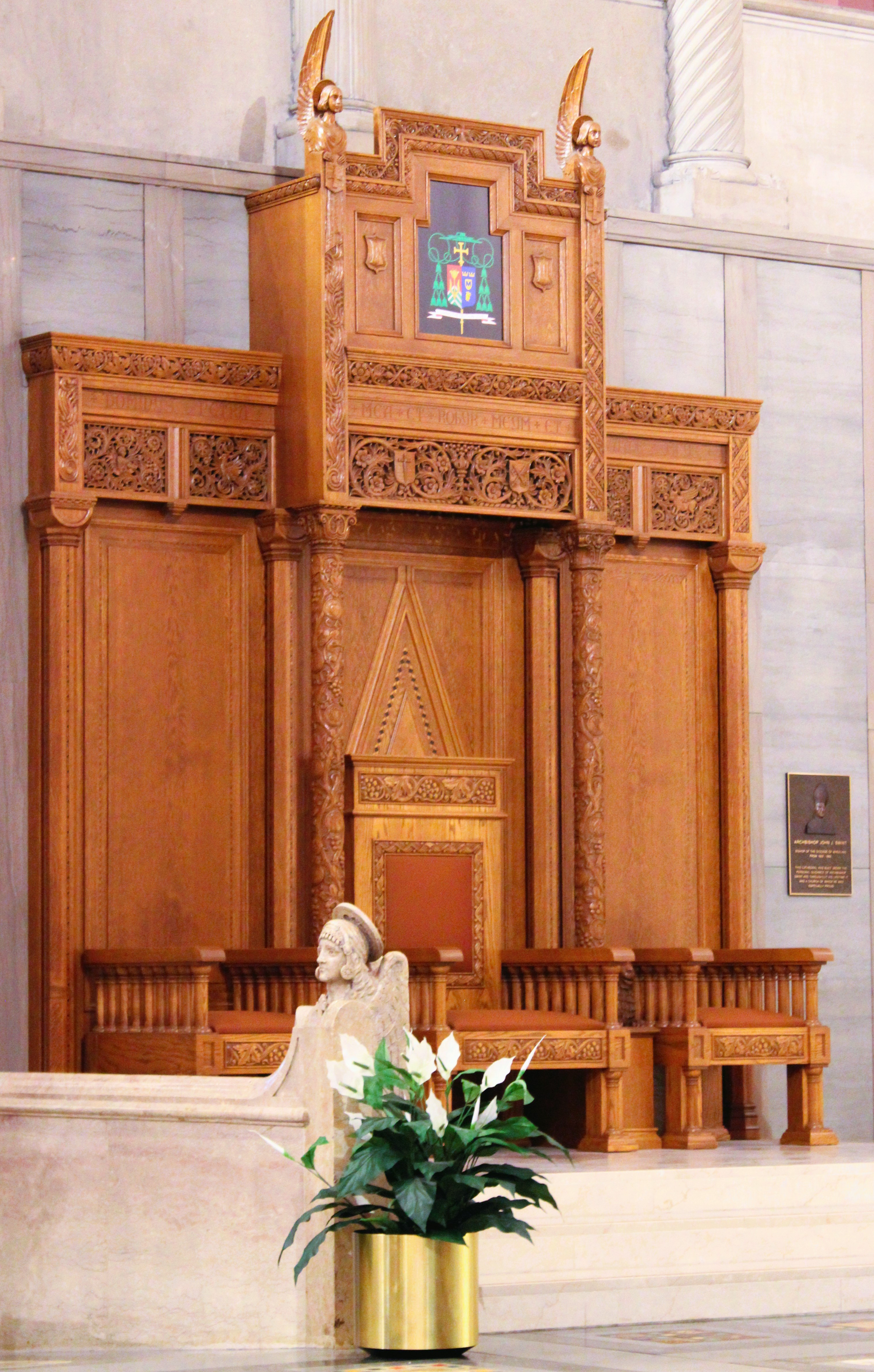
Cathedra (2023)

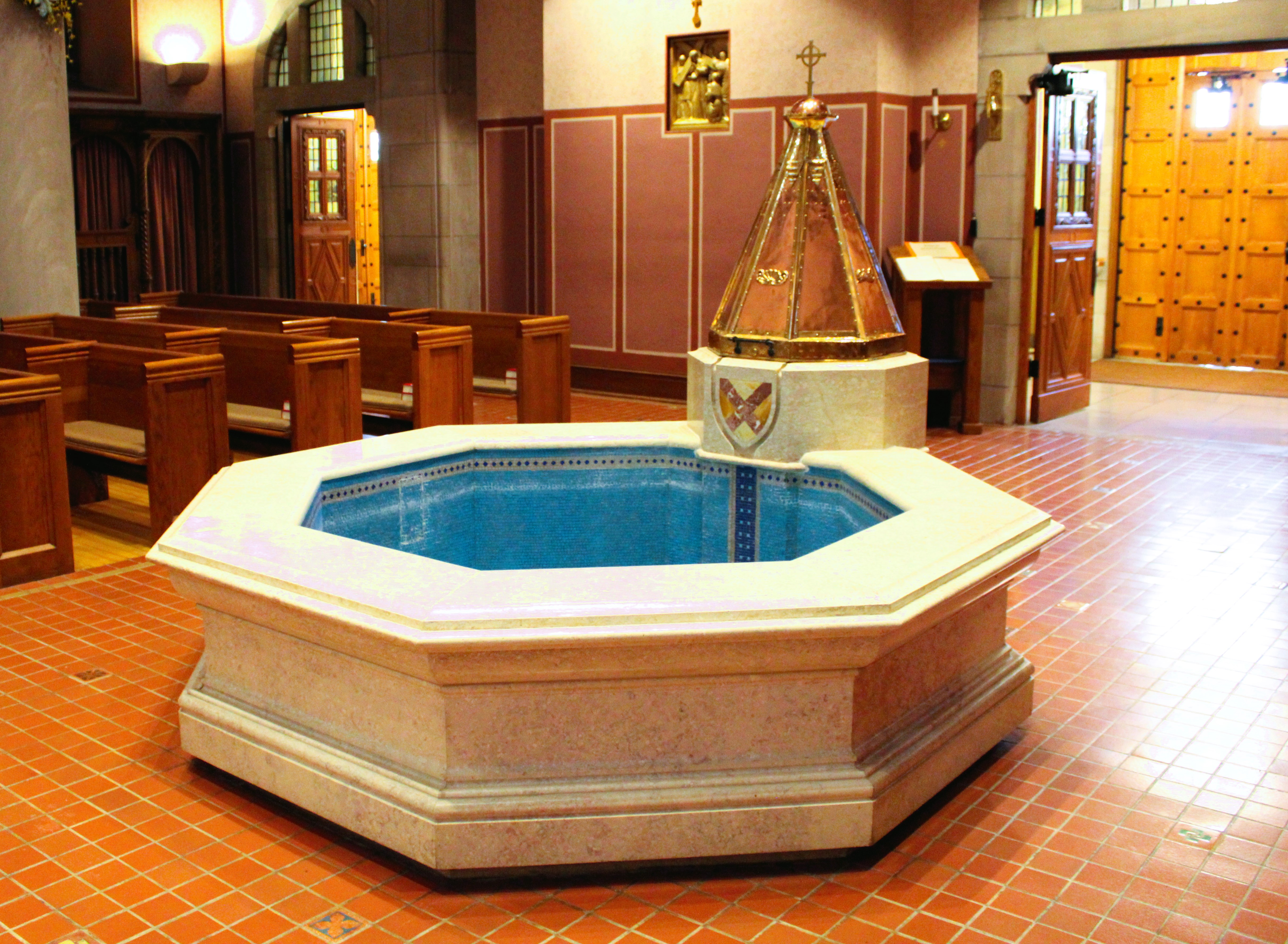
Baptismal font (2023)

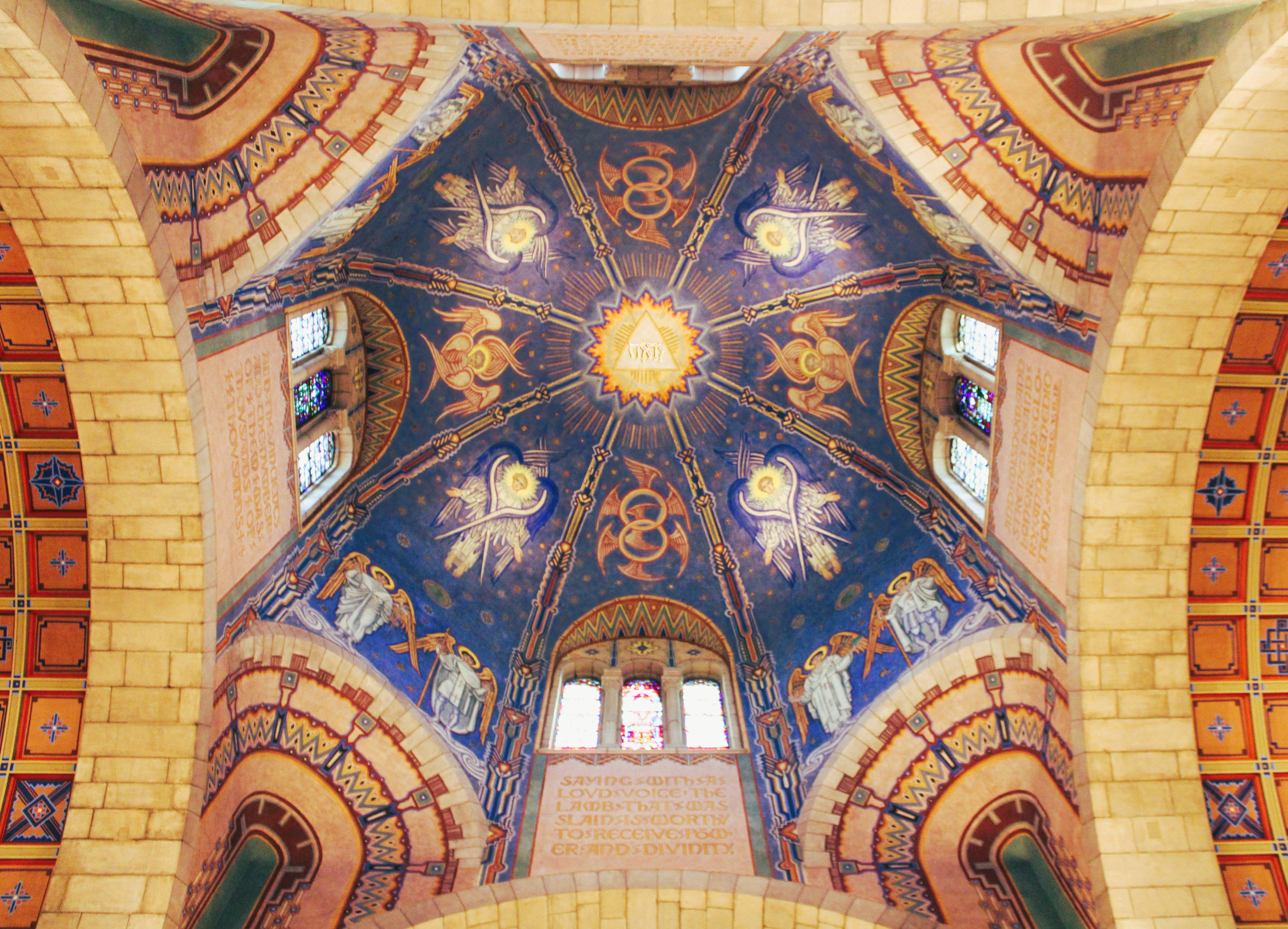
Mural, Depiction of Heaven (2023)

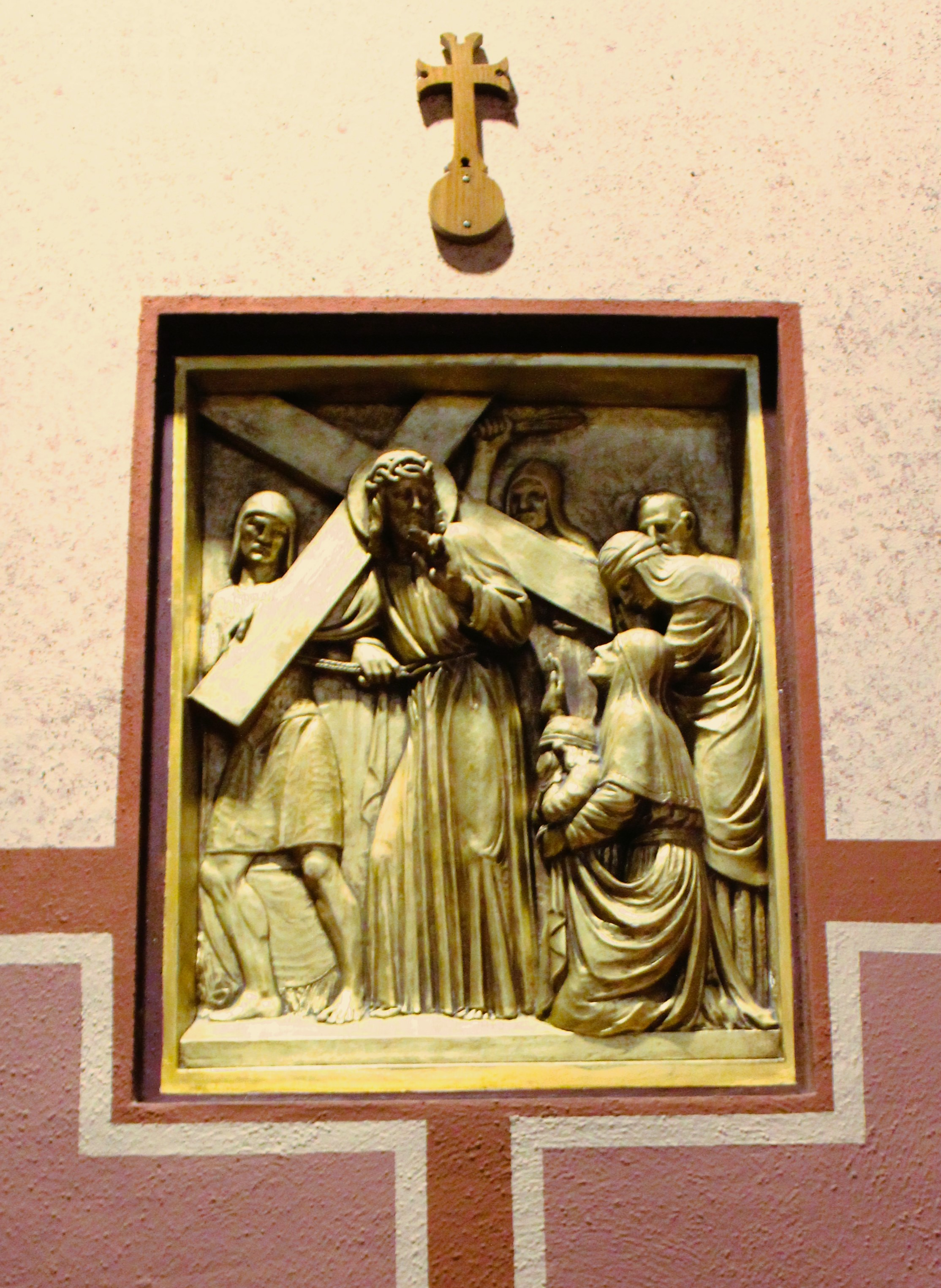
Station of the cross (2023)

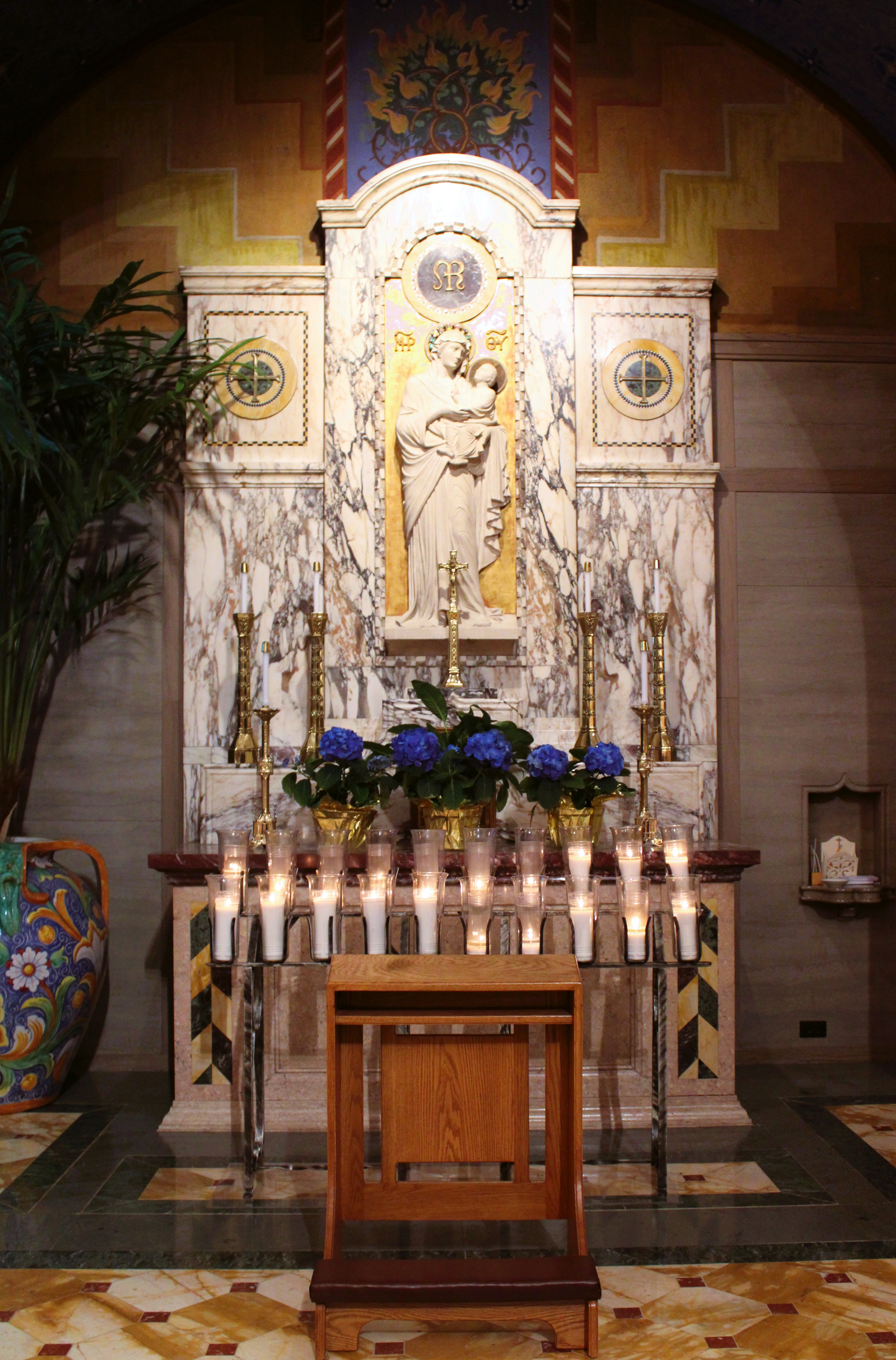
Shrine of the Blessed Virgin (2023)

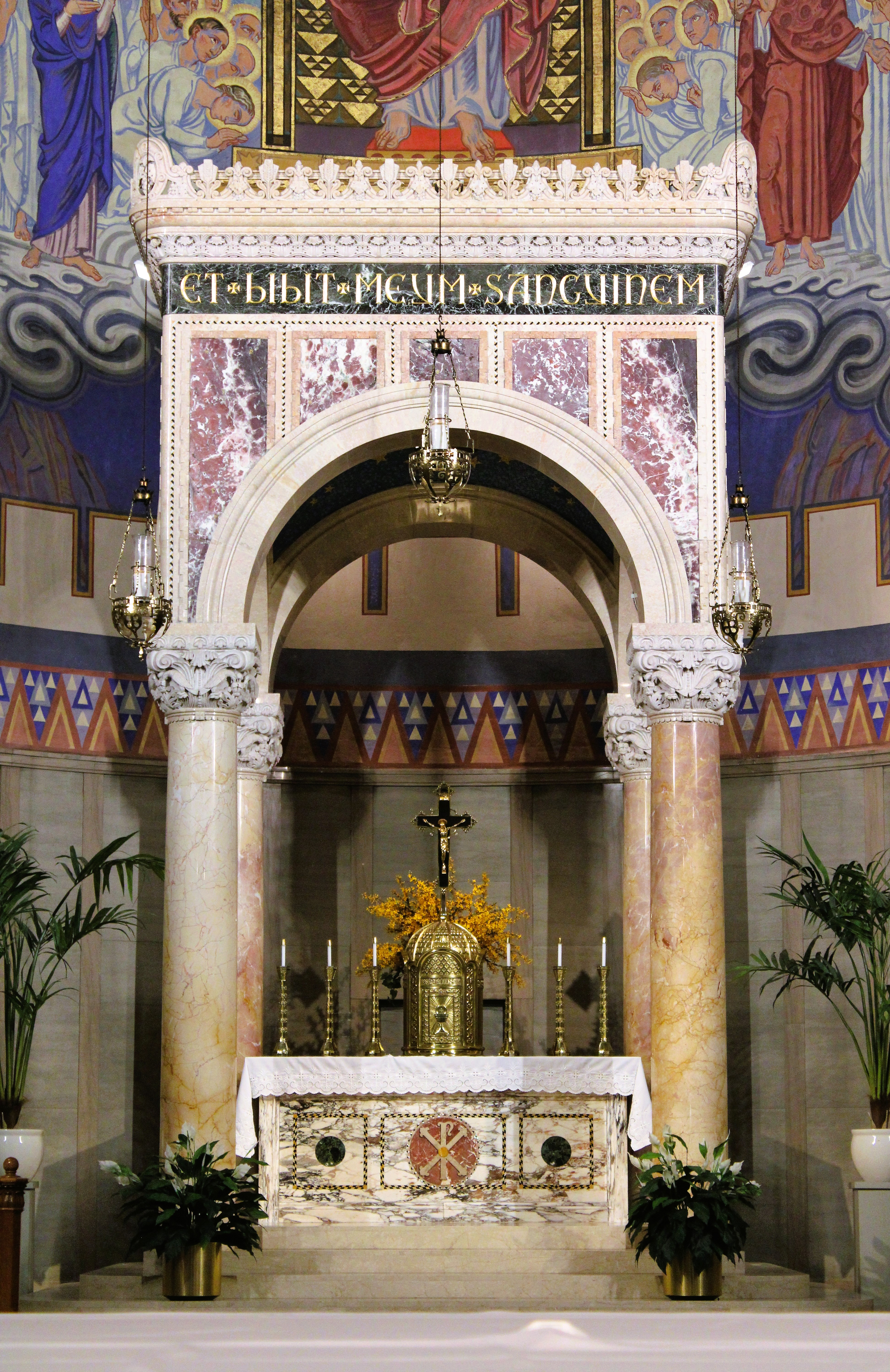
Ciborium (2023)

== See also ==
- List of Catholic cathedrals in the United States
- List of cathedrals in the United States
- Cathedral Parish School
