= Cathedral Parish School =

- U.S. National Register of Historic Places
- U.S. Historic district – Contributing property
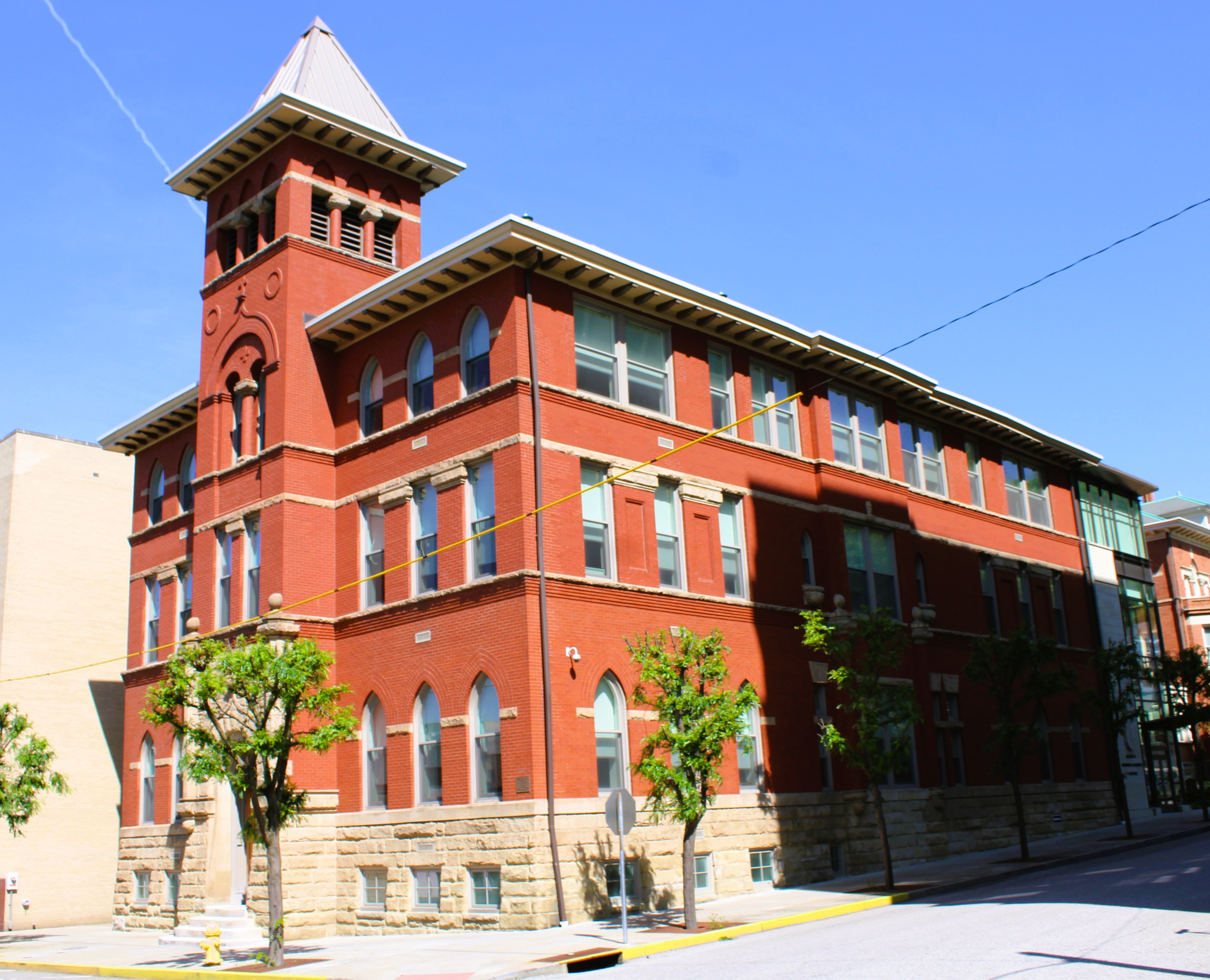
- Cathedral Parish School in 2023

- Location within West Virginia Location within the United States
- Location: Junction of 14th and Byron Sts., Wheeling, West Virginia
- Coordinates: 40°3′59″N 80°43′10″W
- Area: less than one acre
- Built: 1896
- Architectural style: Late Gothic Revival
- NRHP reference No.: 96001572
- Added to NRHP: January 9, 1997

Cathedral Parish School, also known as Wheeling Catholic Elementary and Diocese of Wheeling-Charleston Chancery, was a historic elementary school building located at Wheeling, Ohio County, West Virginia. It was built in 1896–1897, to service the St. Joseph Cathedral parish. A gymnasium addition was built in 1939. It is a three-story brick building, with an elevated first floor. It sits on a sandstone base. It features a center square tower with a pyramidal roof and Late Gothic Revival details.

It was listed on the National Register of Historic Places in 1997. It is located in the East Wheeling Historic District.

== Gallery ==
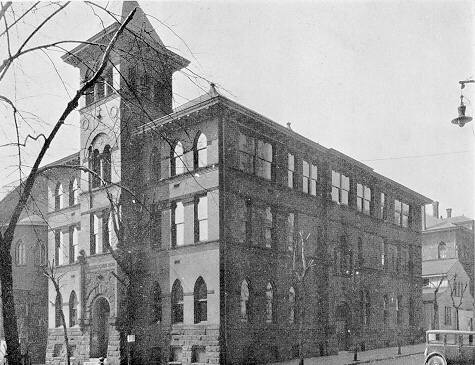
Cathedral Parish School (1920s)

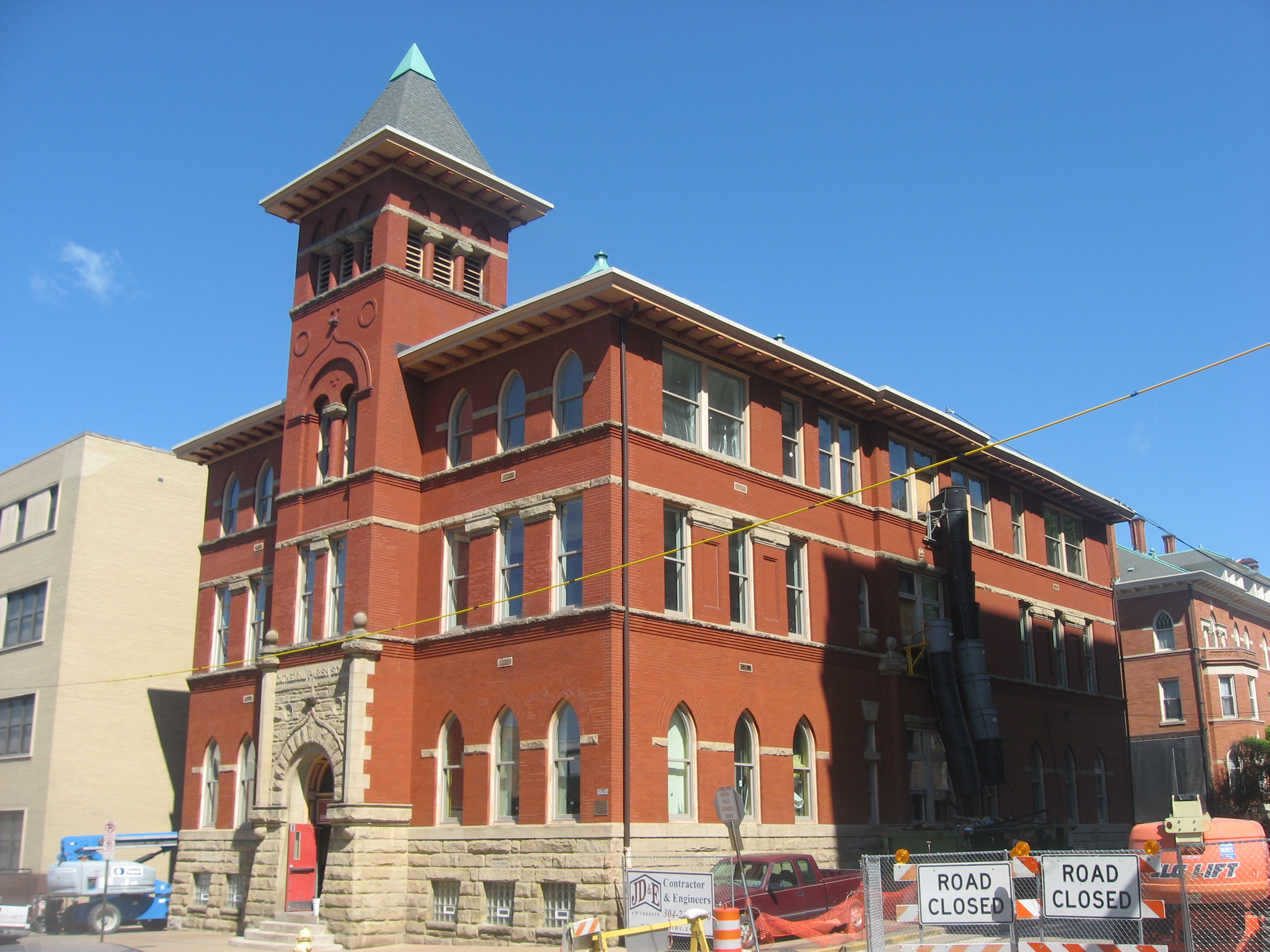
During renovation
