= Cerrone (disambiguation) =

Cerrone is a French disco drummer, composer, record producer and creator of concert shows, born Marc Cerrone.

Cerrone may also refer to:

- Christopher Cerrone (born 1984), American composer
- Dominick Cerrone, Director of Culinary Arts at The French Culinary Institute in New York City
- Donald Cerrone (born 1983), American mixed martial artist and kickboxer
- Mike Cerrone (born 1957), American actor and screenwriter
- Pascal Cerrone (born 1981), Swiss footballer
- Supernature (Cerrone III), album by Cerrone
- Cerrone IV, long title Cerrone IV: The Golden Touch, album by Cerrone
