= Monroe Street East Historic District =

Historic district in West Virginia, United States

- U.S. National Register of Historic Places
- U.S. Historic district
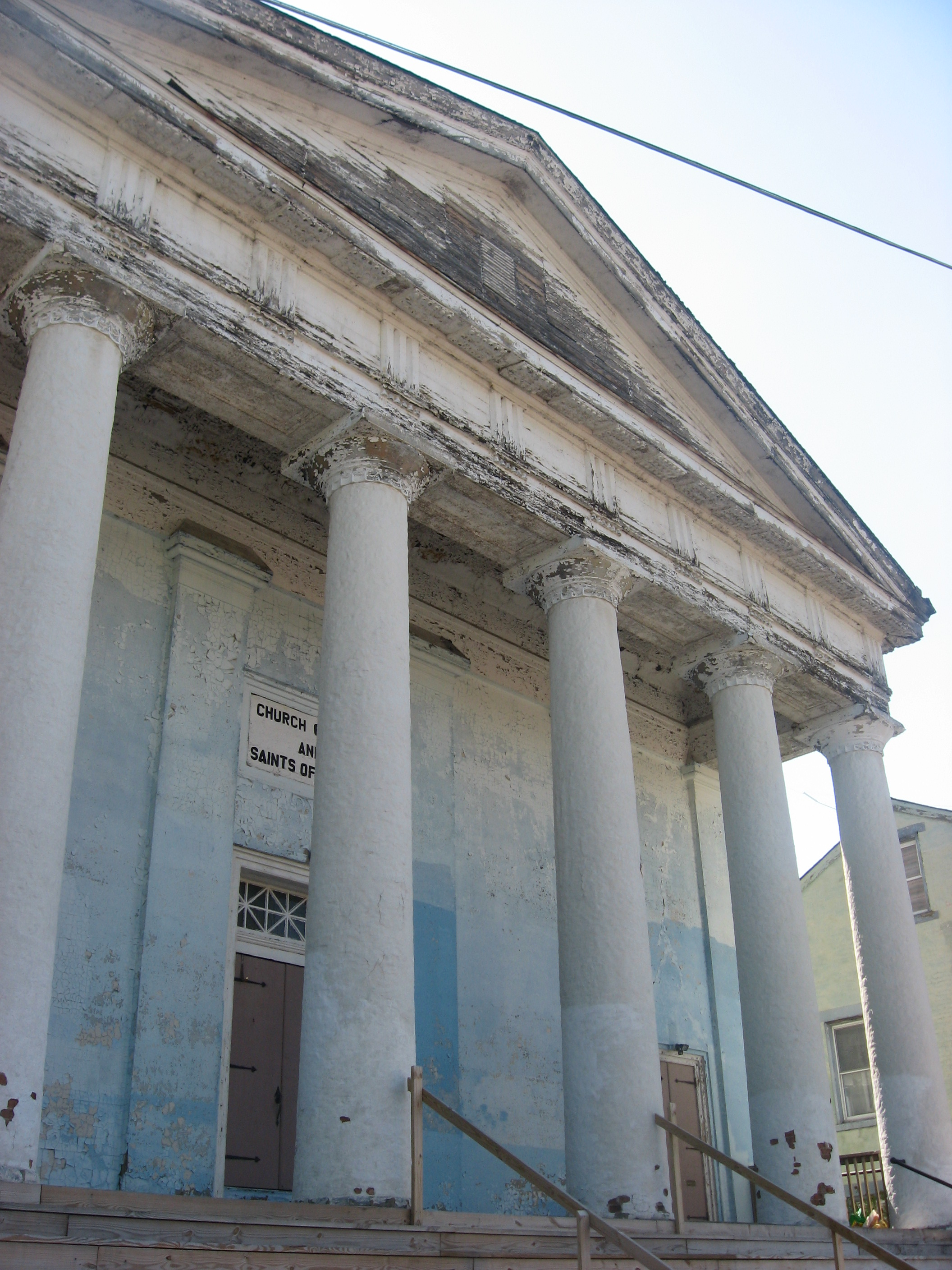
- The Church of God and Saints of Christ, a core part of the district

- Location within West Virginia Location within the United States
- Location: 12th and Byron Sts., Wheeling, West Virginia
- Coordinates: 40°4′12″N 80°43′9″W
- Area: 1.5 acres (0.61 ha)
- Built: 1837
- Architect: Klieves, Kraft & Co.; Wells, E.W.
- Architectural style: Greek Revival, Other, Romanesque, Romano-Tuscan
- NRHP reference No.: 80004036
- Added to NRHP: February 12, 1980

Monroe Street East Historic District is a national historic district located at Wheeling, Ohio County, West Virginia. The district encompasses six contributing buildings. They are a Greek Revival style church built in 1837, a Roman-Tuscan style dwelling dated to 1852 and known as the Paxton-Reed House, and an eclectic 1881 dwelling. Also in the district is a Richardsonian Romanesque style apartment building (c. 1892) and a set of vernacular post-American Civil War townhouses.

It was listed on the National Register of Historic Places in 1980. In 1999, the district was encompassed by the East Wheeling Historic District.
