= Russell Court =

Apartment block in Bloomsbury, London

Coordinates: 51.5238°N 0.1264°W

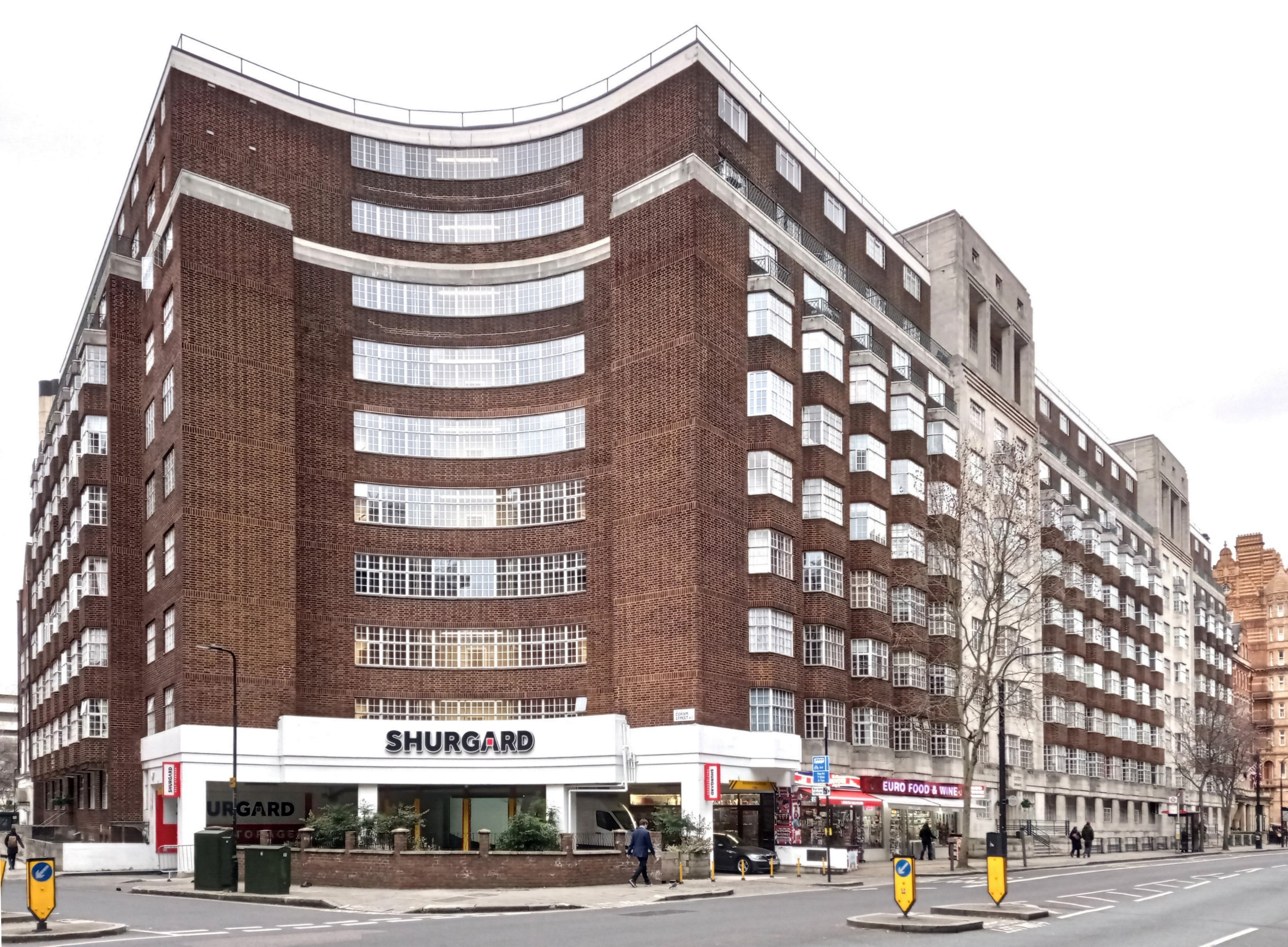
Russell Court, seen from the corner of Coram Street and Woburn Place in 2023

Russell Court is a modernist apartment block in Woburn Place, in the Bloomsbury district of London, on the corner with Coram Street, just north of Russell Square. It was designed by George Val Myer and Francis Watson-Hart on an L-shaped plan with a curved recess on the corner and a motor garage below. It is one of a number of large apartment blocks built in London in the 1930s and has 501 small "bachelor flats" intended for students and people of modest means. Today, the freehold of the property is collectively owned by the flat leaseholders.

== Location ==
Russell Court is on the east side of Woburn Place, on the corner with Coram Street, just north of Russell Square and near the University of London. It occupies an L-shaped site with one pedestrian entrance in Coram Street and two more in Woburn Place. Behind Russell Court is a grade II listed building: the Daimler Car Hire Garage built 1931. Note that Russell Court is not itself a listed building.

== Construction ==
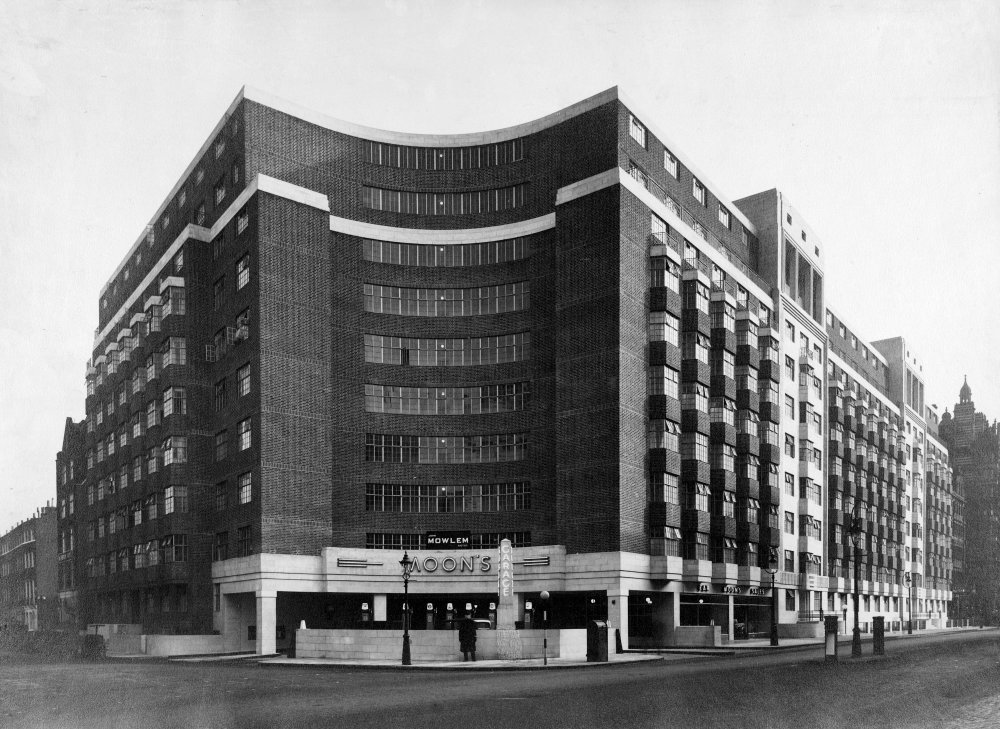
Russell Court soon after completion with garage and Mowlem sign

The building was a project of the London solicitor Gerald Glover, who specialised in real estate development, and is one of a number of very large blocks of flats erected in 1930s London. It was built in 1937 by Mowlem and replaced a row of Georgian terraced houses, latterly converted to small hotels.

== Design ==
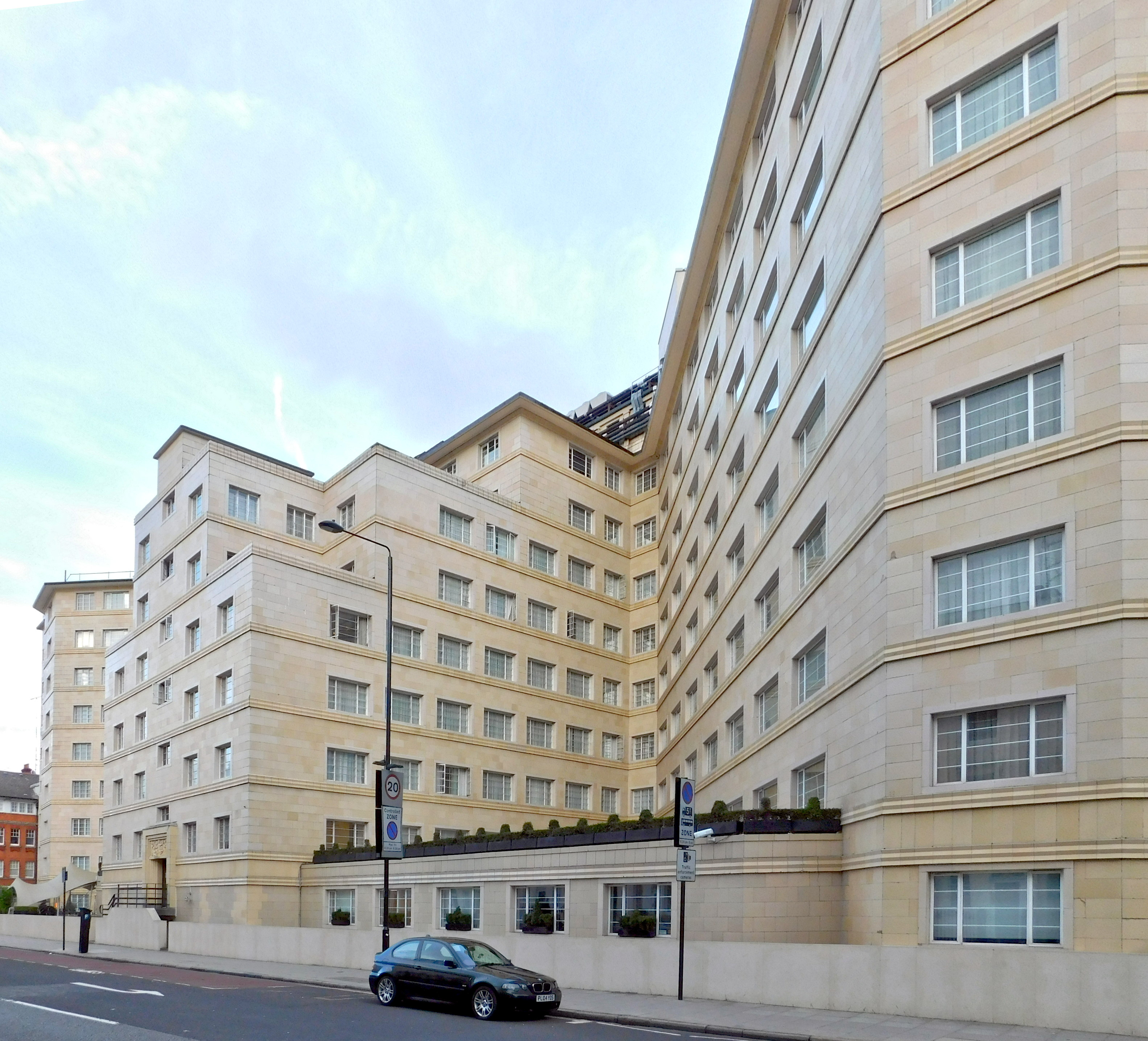
The Meliá White House hotel seen in 2017

Russell Court was designed by George Val Myer and Francis Watson-Hart. Myer was also responsible for the BBC's Broadcasting House in Langham Place.

The block was built to provide "bachelor flats", also referred to as "flatlets" and "service flats", affordable accommodation for university students and people of modest means. It has 501 units over nine storeys, most of which are studio and one-bedroom flats. A block with a similar function is White House in Albany Street, Regents Park, which later became a hotel. Both are distinct from the large four to seven-room flats ("mansion flats") built at that time.

The building has a curved recess on the corner of Woburn Place and Coram Street below which was originally a Moon's garage and petrol station on the ground and lower floors later known as the Russell Court Garage. Daimler Hire Limited, representing Hertz, were operating from the site in the 1950s, hiring-out a variety of motor vehicles, while Hertz Rent a Car advertised it as one of their locations in the 1960s. The garage was later an NCP car park.

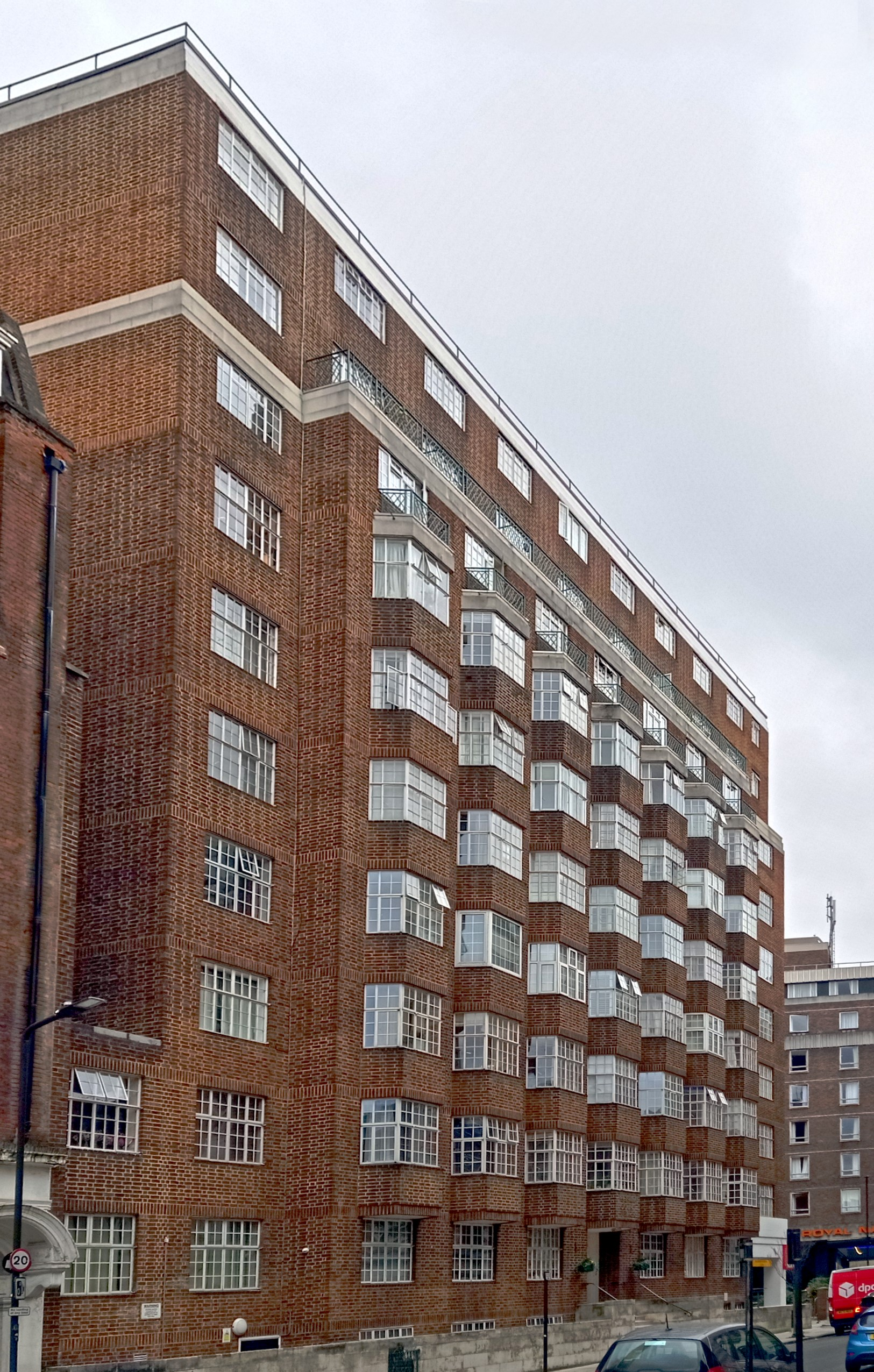
Russell Court north side in Coram Street

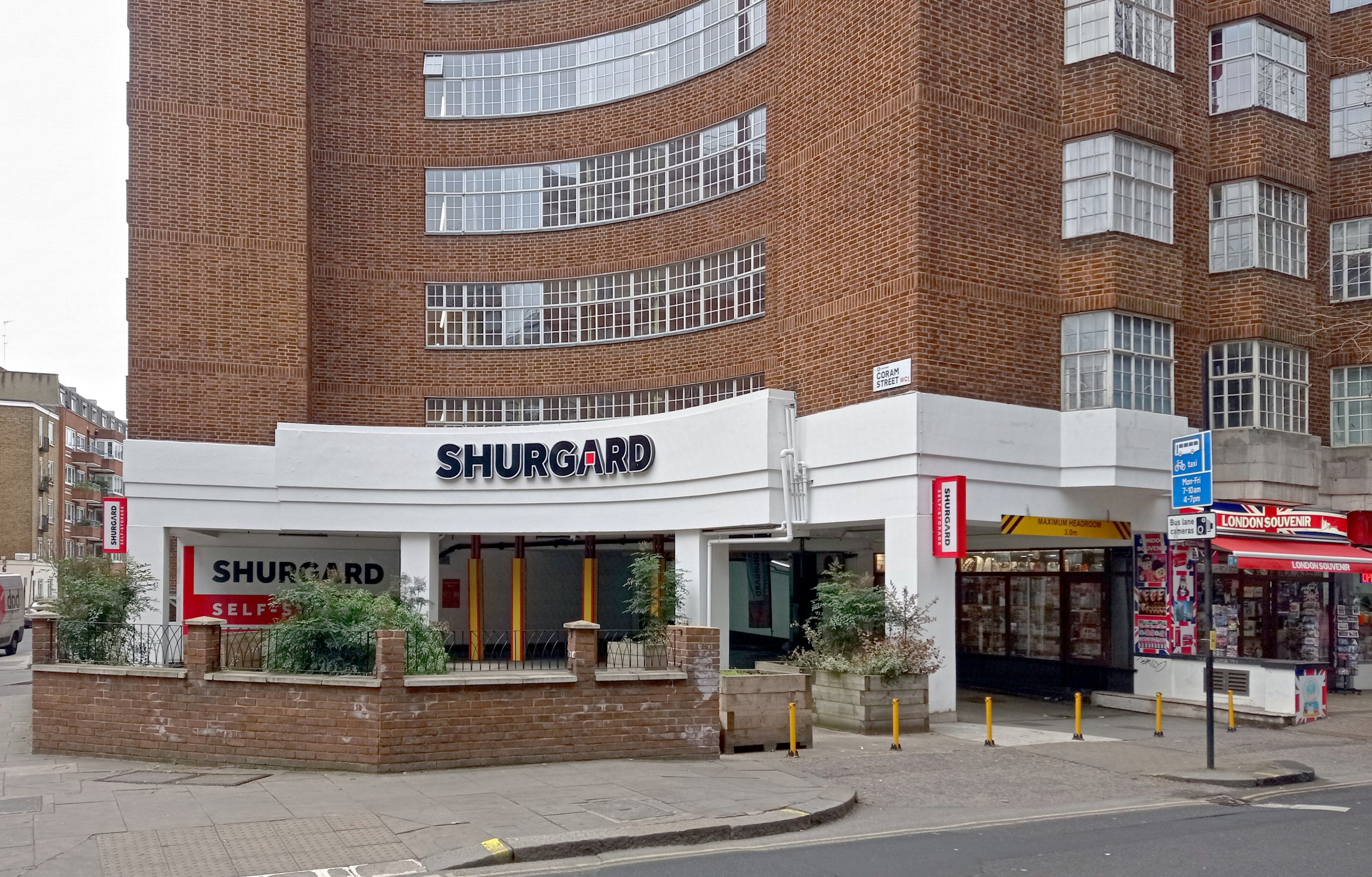
Detail of the former Moon's garage

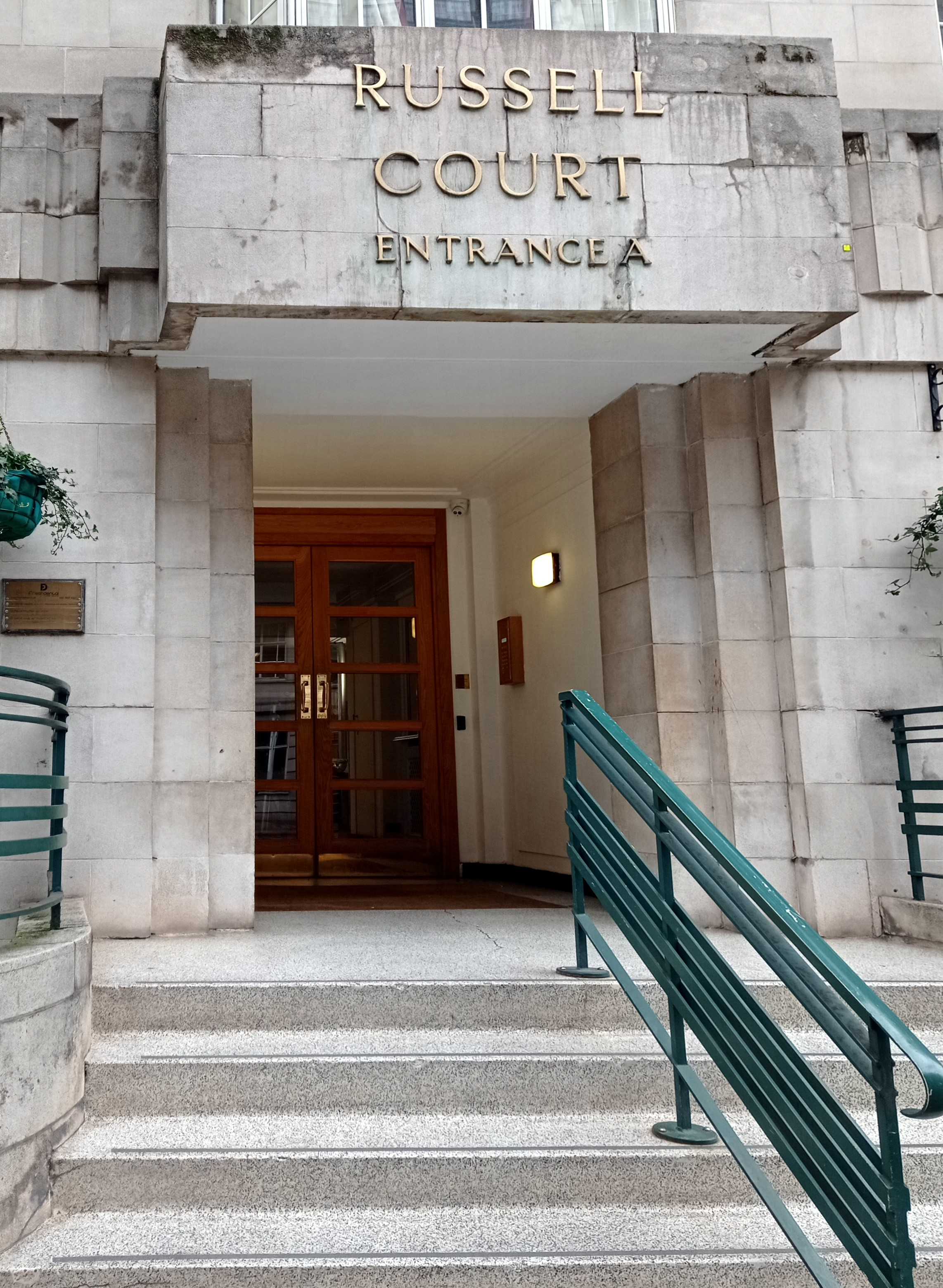
Russell Court, entrance A in Woburn Place

== Today ==
As of 2023, the garage site on the corner with Coram Street is a branch of Shurgard Self-Storage who acquired the site from CitySpaces Self Storage in 2021.

The freehold of the block is owned by Russell Court (Bloomsbury) Management Limited, a company owned by the flat leaseholders and is responsible for the upkeep of the building.

== Notable former residents ==
- Charles F. Klapper, transport writer.
- Sir Stephen Philpot Low, director and editor of the Statutory Publications Office.
- Edmund Penning-Rowsell, wine writer.
- Olivia Manning, poet and writer.
- Camera Press Limited, photographic agency.

== See also ==
- Du Cane Court
