= East Wheeling Historic District =

Historic district in West Virginia, United States

- U.S. National Register of Historic Places
- U.S. Historic district
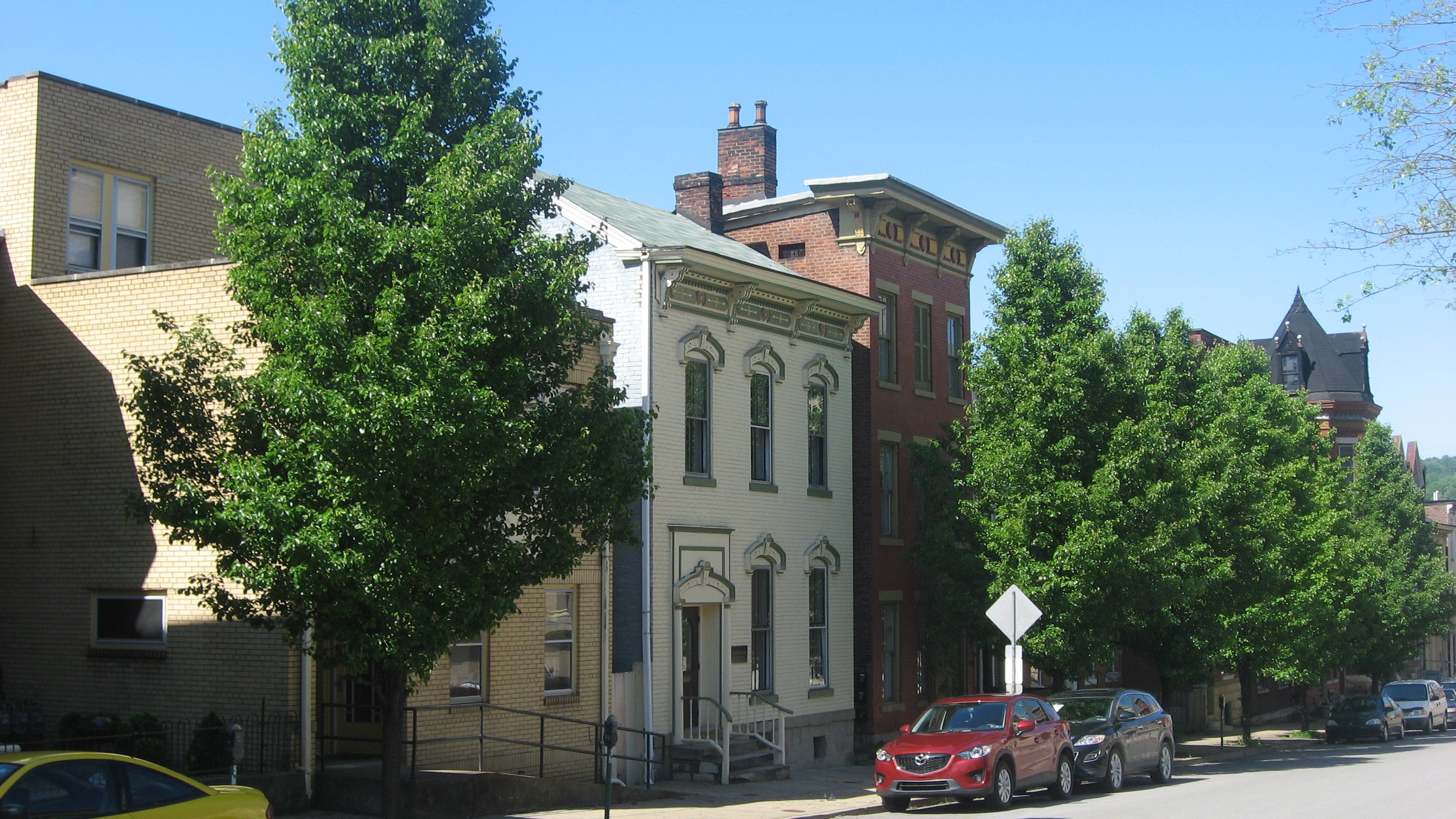
- Fourteenth Street in the district

- Location within West Virginia Location within the United States
- Location: Roughly bounded by Chapline, Eoff, 18th, McColloch, 12th and 11th Sts., Wheeling, West Virginia
- Coordinates: 40°3′58″N 80°42′58″W
- Area: 79 acres (32 ha)
- Built: 1834
- Architect: Frederick F. Faris; Edward B. Fransheim; Roland Johnson; Edward J. Weber; Others
- Architectural style: Greek Revival, Gothic Revival, et al.
- NRHP reference No.: 99001402
- Added to NRHP: November 22, 1999

East Wheeling Historic District is a national historic district located at Wheeling, Ohio County, West Virginia. The district encompasses 300 contributing buildings and one contributing site, including the Monroe Street East Historic District. The district is primarily residential, developed in the late-19th and early-20th century. A number of popular architectural styles are represented including Greek Revival and Gothic Revival. Notable non-residential buildings include St. Joseph Cathedral (1926), former Hazel Atlas Company building (now West Virginia Northern Community College), Scottish Rite Temple designed by noted Wheeling architect Frederick F. Faris (1870-1927), Elks Building, and YMCA (1906), also designed by Faris. The contributing site is Elk Playground. Also located in the district are the separately listed L. S. Good House, Charles W. Russell House, and Cathedral Parish School.

It was listed on the National Register of Historic Places in 1999.
