= Russell School =

Russell School may refer to:

in New Zealand:

- Russell School, Bay of Islands
- Russell School, Porirua East

in the United Kingdom:

- The Russell School (Chorleywood) in Hertfordshire
- The Russell School, a former school in Petersham, London
- The Russell Primary School, in Petersham, London
- Royal Russell School in Croydon

in the United States

- Russell School (Flatwoods, Kentucky), Flatwoods, Kentucky
- Russell School (Lexington, Kentucky), listed on the NRHP in Kentucky
- Russell School (Kalispell, Montana), listed on the NRHP in Montana
- Russell School (Missoula, Montana)
- Russell School (Durham, North Carolina), an NRHP-listed Rosenwald school

== See also ==
- Russell High School (disambiguation)
