= Charles F. Klapper =

American writer and journalist

Charles F. Klapper Charles Frederick Klapper (29 March 1905-1980) was a transport writer and editor of Modern Transport magazine and Trains Illustrated. He was vice-president of the Institute of Transport and President of the Railway & Canal Historical Society and the London Underground Railway Society.

== Selected publications ==
- British Lorries, 1900-1945
- London's Lost Railways
- Golden Age of Buses
- Roads & Rails of London 1900-1933
- The Golden Age of Tramways
- Sir Herbert Walker's Southern Railway
- Buses and Trams
