= Charles Russell House (Winchester, Massachusetts) =

Historic house in Massachusetts, United States

- U.S. National Register of Historic Places
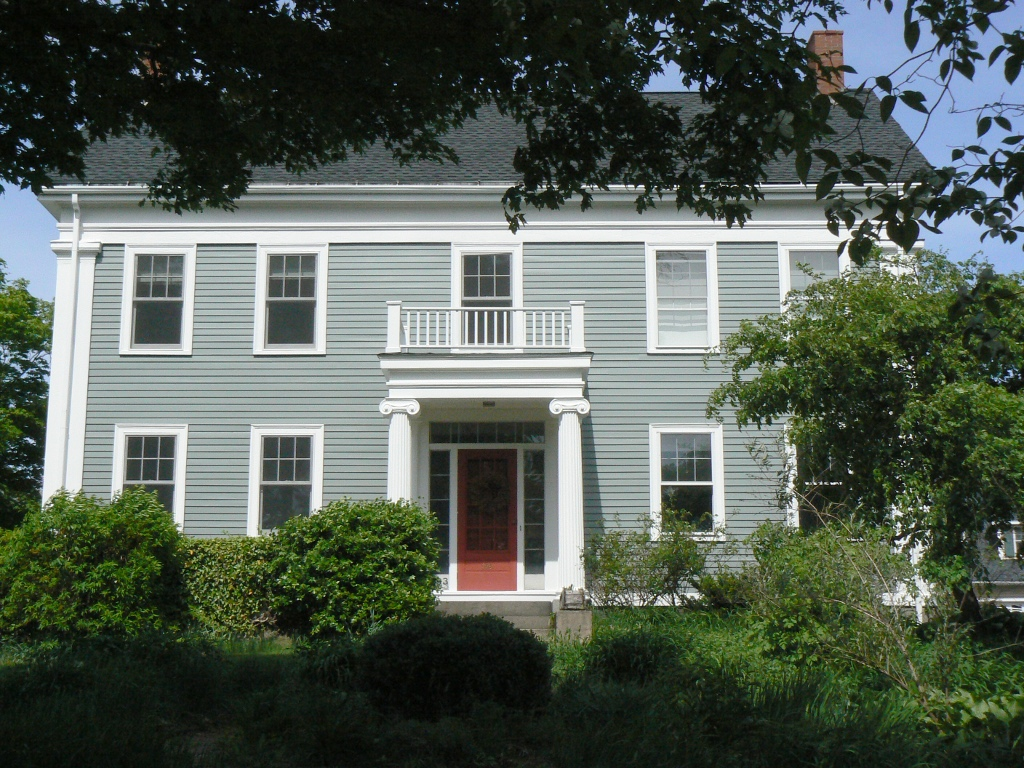

- Location within Massachusetts Location within the United States
- Location: Winchester, Massachusetts
- Coordinates: 42°27′52″N 71°8′43″W
- Built: 1841
- Architect: unknown
- Architectural style: Greek Revival
- MPS: Winchester MRA
- NRHP reference No.: 89000617
- Added to NRHP: July 5, 1989

The Charles Russell House is a historic house at 993 Main Street in Winchester, Massachusetts. The 2 1/2-story wood-frame house was built by Charles Russell in 1841, on a site that was one of the first settled in what is now Winchester. The five-bay facade has a center entry that is framed by sidelight and transom windows, and is sheltered by a portico with fluted Ionic columns. The house also has corner pilasters and a high entablature.

The house was listed on the National Register of Historic Places in 1989.

== See also ==
- National Register of Historic Places listings in Winchester, Massachusetts
