= Russell High School (Kentucky) =

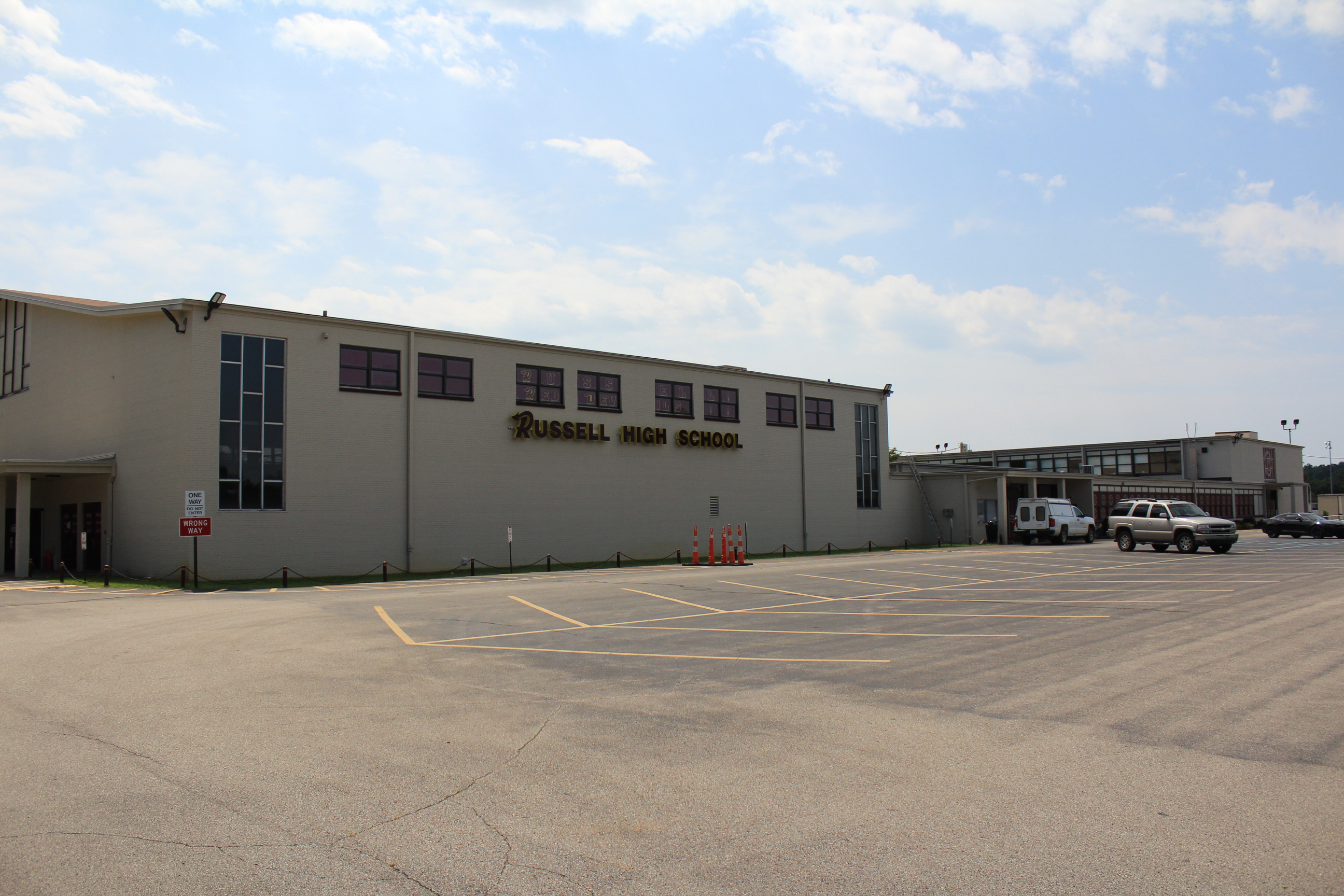

Location
- 709 Red Devil Lane; Russell, Greenup County, Kentucky 41169; United States; 38.5119°N 82.7056°W

Information
- Type: Public high school
- Established: 1962
- School district: Russell Independent School District
- Superintendent: M. Sean Horne
- NCES School ID: 210513001272
- Principal: David Caniff
- Teaching staff: 38.83 (FTE)
- Enrollment: 618 (2023-2024)
- Student to teacher ratio: 15.94
- Color
- Fight song: "Washington and Lee Swing"
- Team name: Red Devils
- Website: www.russellind.kyschools.us

Russell High School is a public high school located in both Russell, Kentucky and Flatwoods, Kentucky.

The school was built in 1962 in Flatwoods/Kenwood (the area was later annexed by the city of Russell) and is located on the main campus of the Russell Independent School District, which also includes Russell Middle School (built in 1969), Russell Area Technology Center, Russell Primary School as well as the majority of the district's athletic facilities. Its school mascot is the Red Devils. Notable alumni include Billy Ray Cyrus (class of 1979).
