= The Russell (Worcester, Massachusetts) =

- U.S. National Register of Historic Places
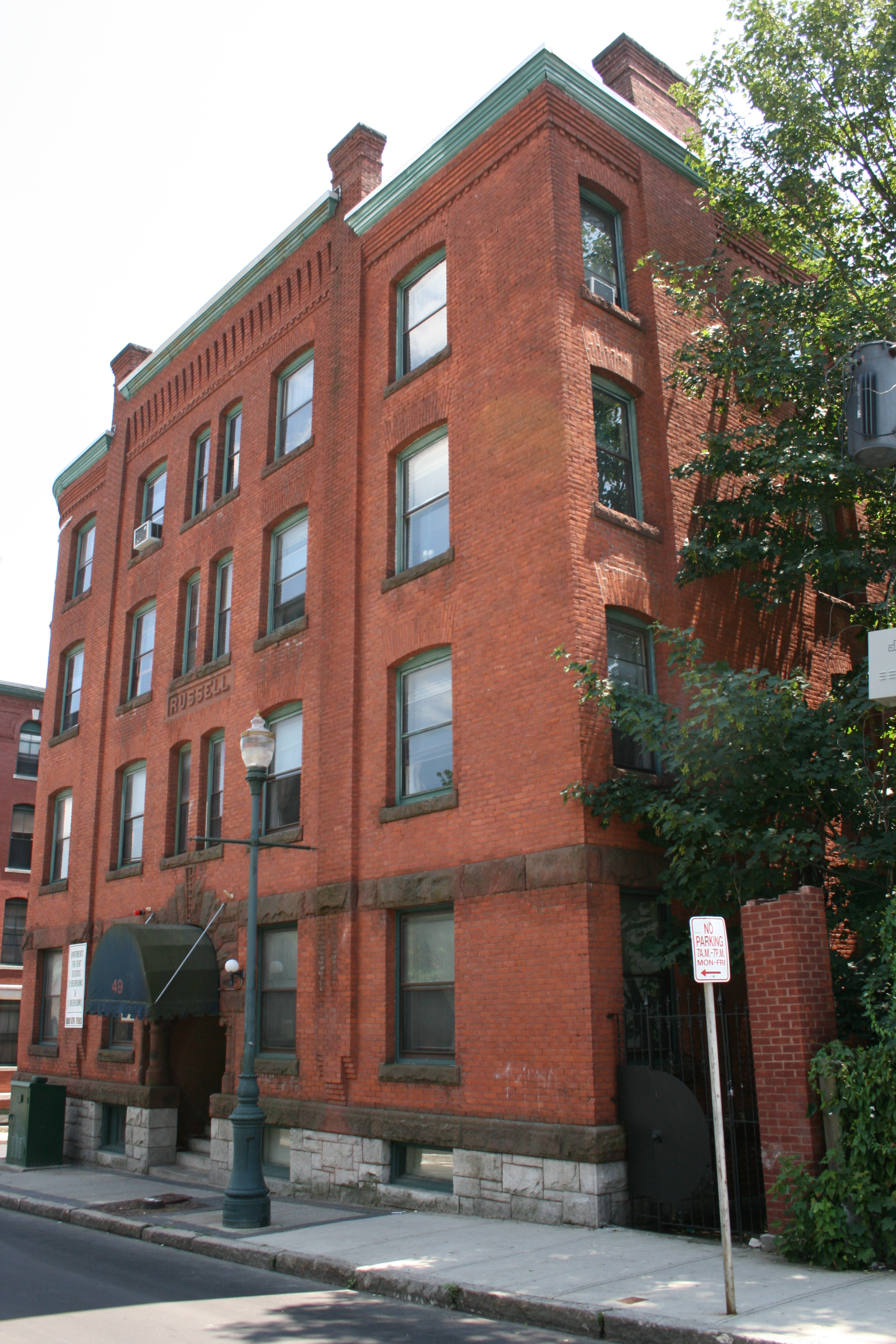

- Location within Massachusetts Location within the United States
- Location: 49 Austin St., Worcester, Massachusetts
- Coordinates: 42°15′39″N 71°48′24″W
- Area: 0.1 acres (0.040 ha)
- Built: 1894
- Architect: Barker & Nourse
- Architectural style: Richardsonian Romanesque
- MPS: Worcester MRA
- NRHP reference No.: 85002782
- Added to NRHP: November 7, 1985

The Russell is an historic apartment house in Worcester, Massachusetts. Built in 1894, it is one of the few surviving apartment blocks, of many built, in the Main-Wellington-Chandler area, which had one of the city's highest concentrations of such buildings by 1900. The building was listed on the National Register of Historic Places in 1985.

== Description and history ==
The Russell stands on the southwest corner of Austin and Irving Streets, a short way southwest of Worcester's central downtown area. It is a four-story masonry structure, built out of red brick with brownstone trim. The main facade faces north toward Austin Street, and is five bays wide, with stone beltcourses below and above the first floor. Windows are set in rectangular openings at the first floor, and in segmented-arch openings above, with stone sills and lintels of soldier bricks. The entrance is in the center bay, set in a Romanesque round-arch openings with stone voussoirs. The bays above the entrance have paired narrow windows set on shared stone lintels. The building name appears in a panel between the second and third floors. Pilasters rise flanking the central three bays, beyond the top of the building to form a parapet, with corbelled brickwork between.

The building was designed by Barker & Nourse and built in 1894 at a cost of $25,000 for Abigail Russell Parsons. The Main-Wellington-Chandler area, convenient to downtown Worcester, experienced rapid growth in the 1880s and 1890s. Many of its apartment blocks have since been torn down, and this is one of a few surviving remnants of that past.

== See also ==
- Willard Richmond Apartment Block, directly across Irving Street, also designed by Barker & Nourse
- National Register of Historic Places listings in northwestern Worcester, Massachusetts
- National Register of Historic Places listings in Worcester County, Massachusetts
