= William Russell House (Lewes, Delaware) =

Historic house in Delaware, United States

- U.S. National Register of Historic Places
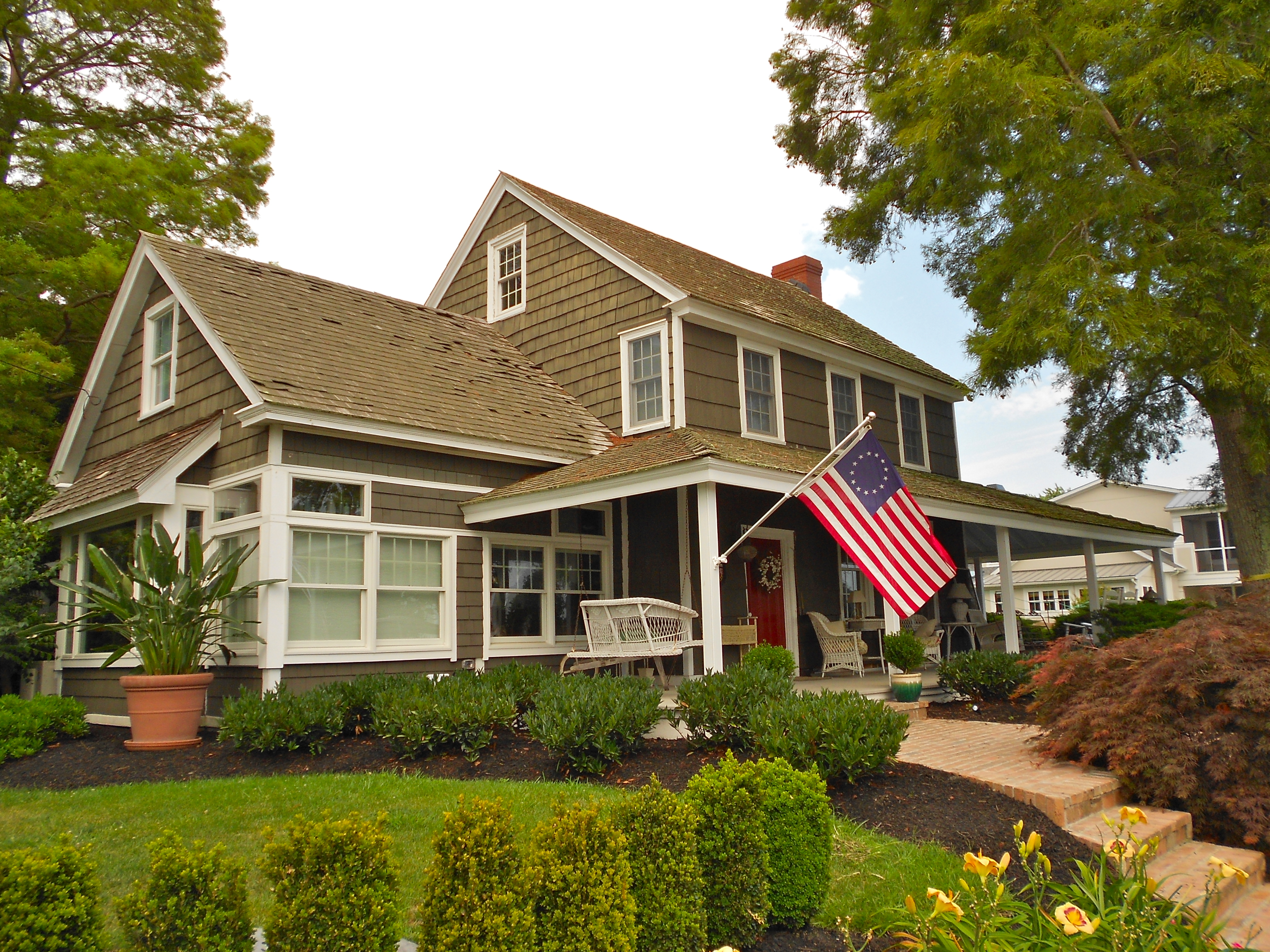
- William Russell House, July 2012

- Location within Delaware Location within the United States
- Location: 410 Pilot Town Rd., Lewes, Delaware
- Coordinates: 38°46′46″N 75°9′3″W
- Area: 1 acre (0.40 ha)
- Built: 1803
- Built by: Virden, William
- NRHP reference No.: 77000395
- Added to NRHP: April 18, 1977

William Russell House, also known as the Russell Farmhouse, is a historic home located at Lewes, Sussex County, Delaware. It was built in 1803, and is two-story, three-bay, double-pile, side-hall, frame house. A rear wing consists of an original one-room addition and a 20th-century addition. It is sheathed in cypress siding. Also on the property is an original brick milk house. It was the home of William Russell, a tanner and large landowner in early-19th-century Lewes.

It was added to the National Register of Historic Places in 1977.
