= Charles W. Russell House =

Historic house in West Virginia, United States

- U.S. National Register of Historic Places
- U.S. Historic district – Contributing property
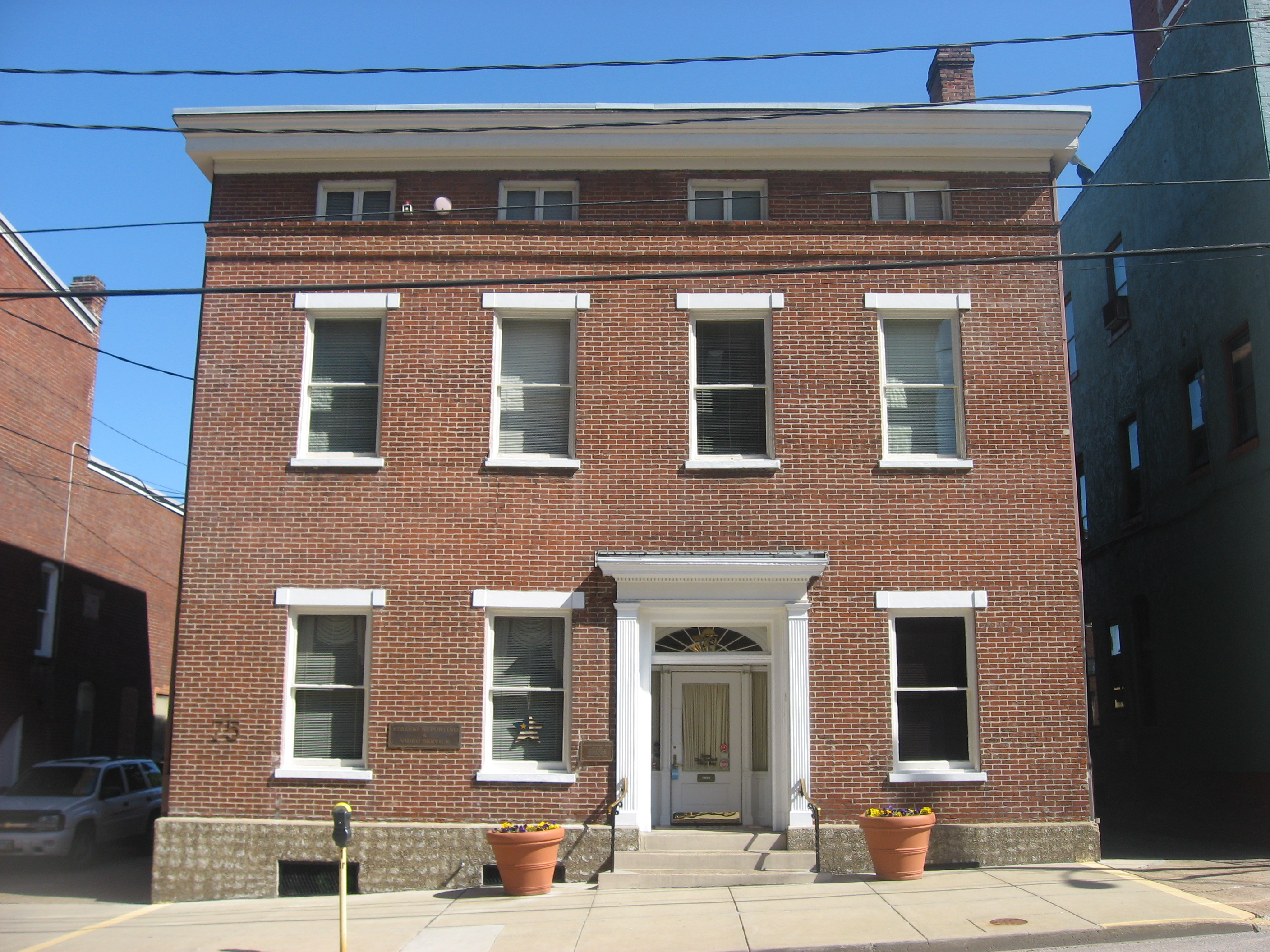
- Front of the house

- Location within West Virginia Location within the United States
- Location: 75 Twelfth St., Wheeling, West Virginia
- Coordinates: 40°4′3″N 80°43′16″W
- Area: less than one acre
- Built: 1848
- Architectural style: Greek Revival
- NRHP reference No.: 93001229
- Added to NRHP: November 12, 1993

Charles W. Russell House is a historic home located at Wheeling, Ohio County, West Virginia. It was built in 1848, and is a 2 1/2-story, four-bay-wide, Greek Revival-style brick dwelling. It was constructed as an office and residence for attorney Charles W. Russell (1818-1867). It was part of the military headquarters established at Wheeling during the first winter of the American Civil War.

It was listed on the National Register of Historic Places in 1993. It is located in the East Wheeling Historic District.
