= Joseph and William Russell House =

Historic house in Rhode Island, United States

- U.S. National Register of Historic Places
- U.S. National Historic Landmark District – Contributing property
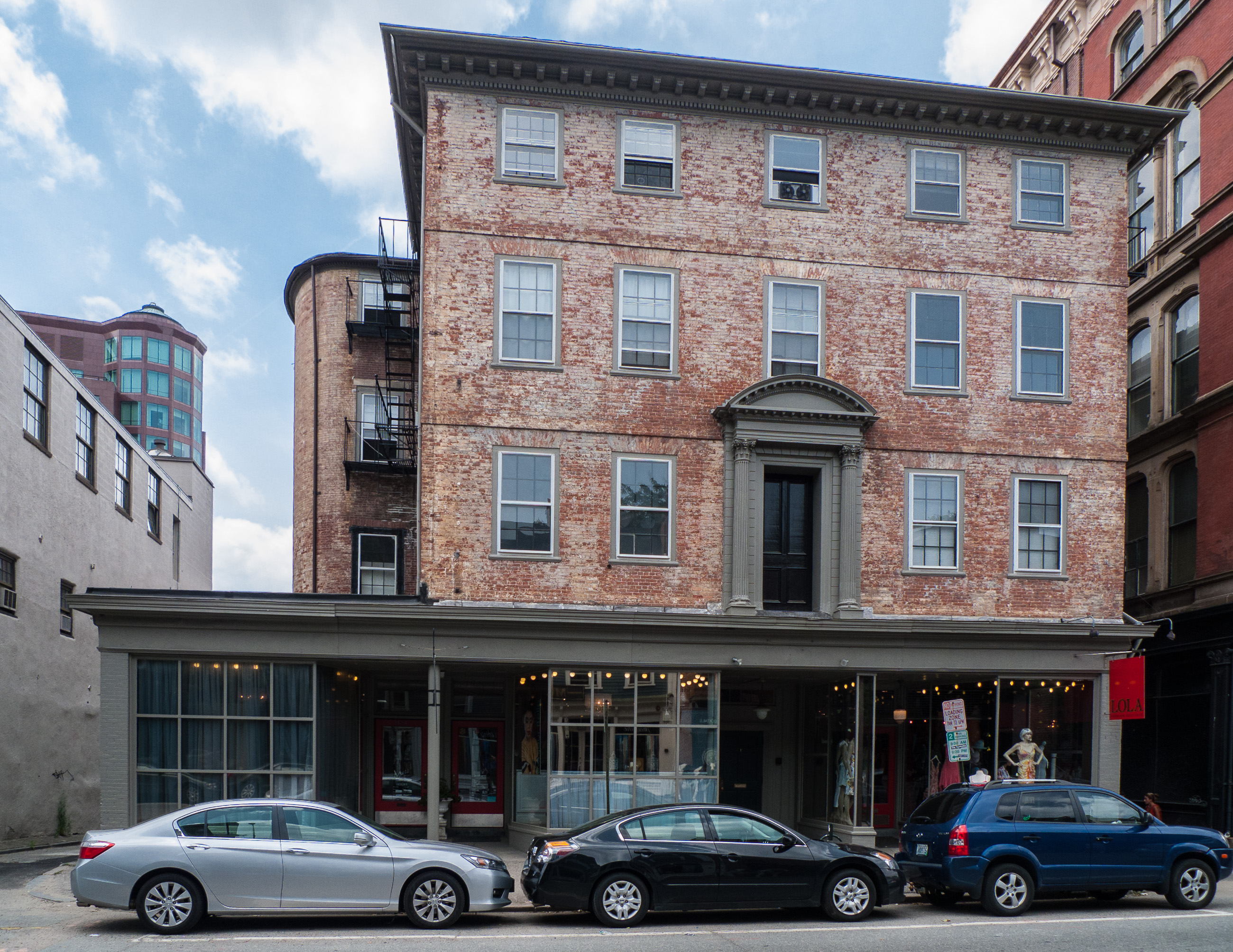
- Russell House in 2014

- Location within Rhode Island Location within the United States
- Location: Providence, Rhode Island
- Coordinates: 41°49′41.49″N 71°24′34.47″W
- Built: 1772
- Built by: Zephaniah Andrews
- Architectural style: Georgian
- Part of: College Hill Historic District (ID70000019)
- NRHP reference No.: 71000001

Significant dates
- Added to NRHP: August 12, 1971
- Designated NHLDCP: November 10, 1970

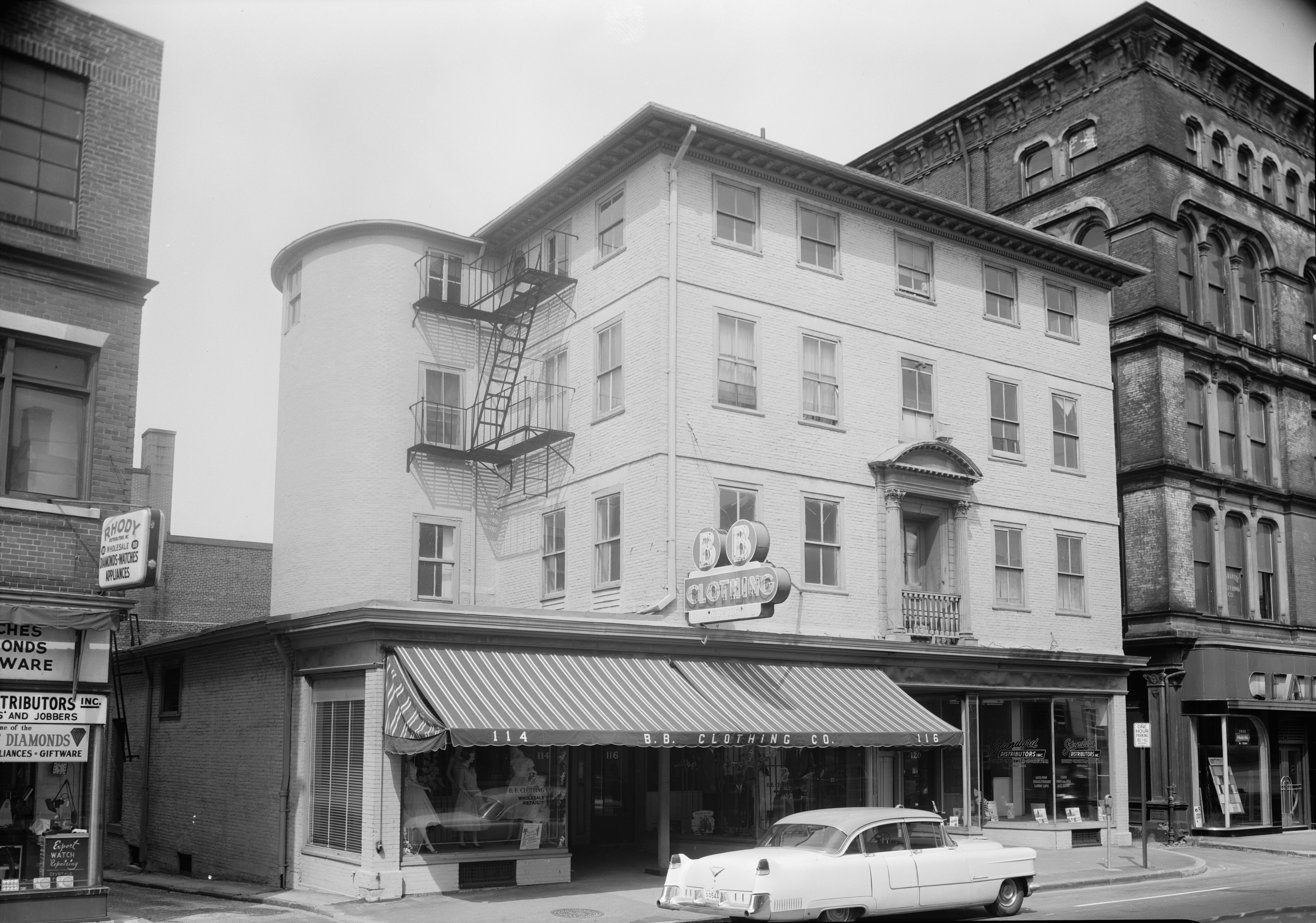
Russell House in 1958

The Joseph and William Russell House is a historic house at 118 North Main Street in the College Hill area of Providence, Rhode Island, United States. It is a brick Georgian house built in 1772. Its original interior woodwork has been removed and distributed among museums around the United States.

The house was listed on the National Register of Historic Places in 1971.

== History ==
The house was built in 1772 as the residence of brothers Joseph Russell (1732–1792) and William Russell (1739–1825). The Russell brothers were merchants and were heavily invested in trade with England and the West Indies.

Zephaniah Andrews (1761–1818) was the mason who built the house. Andrews also built the Market House and the John Brown House. The architect is not documented, but it may have been designed by Joseph Brown.

As an aide to Comte de Rochambeau in the American Revolution, François-Jean de Chastellux stayed in the house in June, 1781 as a guest of Joseph Russell during preparations to march to meet the Continental Army at Dobbs Ferry, New York.

The house was later acquired by Amos Throop (1738–1814), a physician who was founding president of the Rhode Island Medical Society in 1812. When Throop died in 1814, he left the property to Zachariah Allen (1795–1882), son of his brother-in-law, Zachariah Allen Sr. (1738–1801). Allen appears to have lived in the house until his new house was completed on Magee Street, now Bannister Street, in 1864. The house remained largely in its original condition until the 1870s. North Main Street was widened during 1871 to 1873, and at this time the house was raised up one story, with several stores inserted below. In 1875 the house was owned by Henry C. Cranston, who operated it as the Clarendon Hotel.

In 1920 the house was renovated for office uses. At this time much of the interior woodwork was removed, some of which was purchased by museums: the formal northeast parlor is in the collection of the Brooklyn Museum, while the more informal southeast parlor is in that of the Minneapolis Institute of Art. Additional woodwork was formerly in the collection of the Denver Art Museum, though it was later deaccessioned and auctioned off.

Since its 1920s renovation, space the house has been used for various purposes, including shops, offices, artist studios, galleries and apartments.

== Architecture ==
Architectural historian Antoinette Downing found that the Russell House was one of the earliest examples of high-style Georgian architecture in Providence. Many examples of Georgian and Palladian architecture had been built in and around Newport prior to 1770, but very few elsewhere in the colony. As originally built, the Russell House was three stories high and five bays wide, and was nearly a cube. It is built of brick with wood detailing. The design of the Corinthian door surround is believed to be based on Plate 36 of The Builder's Complete Assistant by Batty Langley, originally published in 1736, a copy of which was then in the collection of the Providence Library. The house's exterior ornament is otherwise limited to the matching Corinthian cornice.

As mercantile fortunes grew after the Revolution, many houses of this type and size were built in Providence, including several which are larger than the Russell House. These include the John Brown House (1786, Joseph Brown) and the Nightingale–Brown House (1792, Caleb Ormsbee).

== See also ==
- National Register of Historic Places listings in Providence, Rhode Island
