= Dominick Cerrone =

American chef

- Education: Hudson Valley Community College

Dominick Cerrone was the director of culinary arts at The French Culinary Institute in New York City, one of the top programs in the world. His culinary experience comes from serving as a chef at Le Chantilly, Le Cirque, The Polo, Tavern on the Green and Le Périgord. He also helped to open the famed Le Bernardin, also in New York. He holds a degree in electrical technology and intends to incorporate more technology in the institute's programs. He currently works as an associate professor at the Culinary Institute of America.

== Education ==
AAS, Hudson Valley Community College, Troy, New York
