= Charles B. Russell House =

Historic house in Ohio, United States

- U.S. National Register of Historic Places
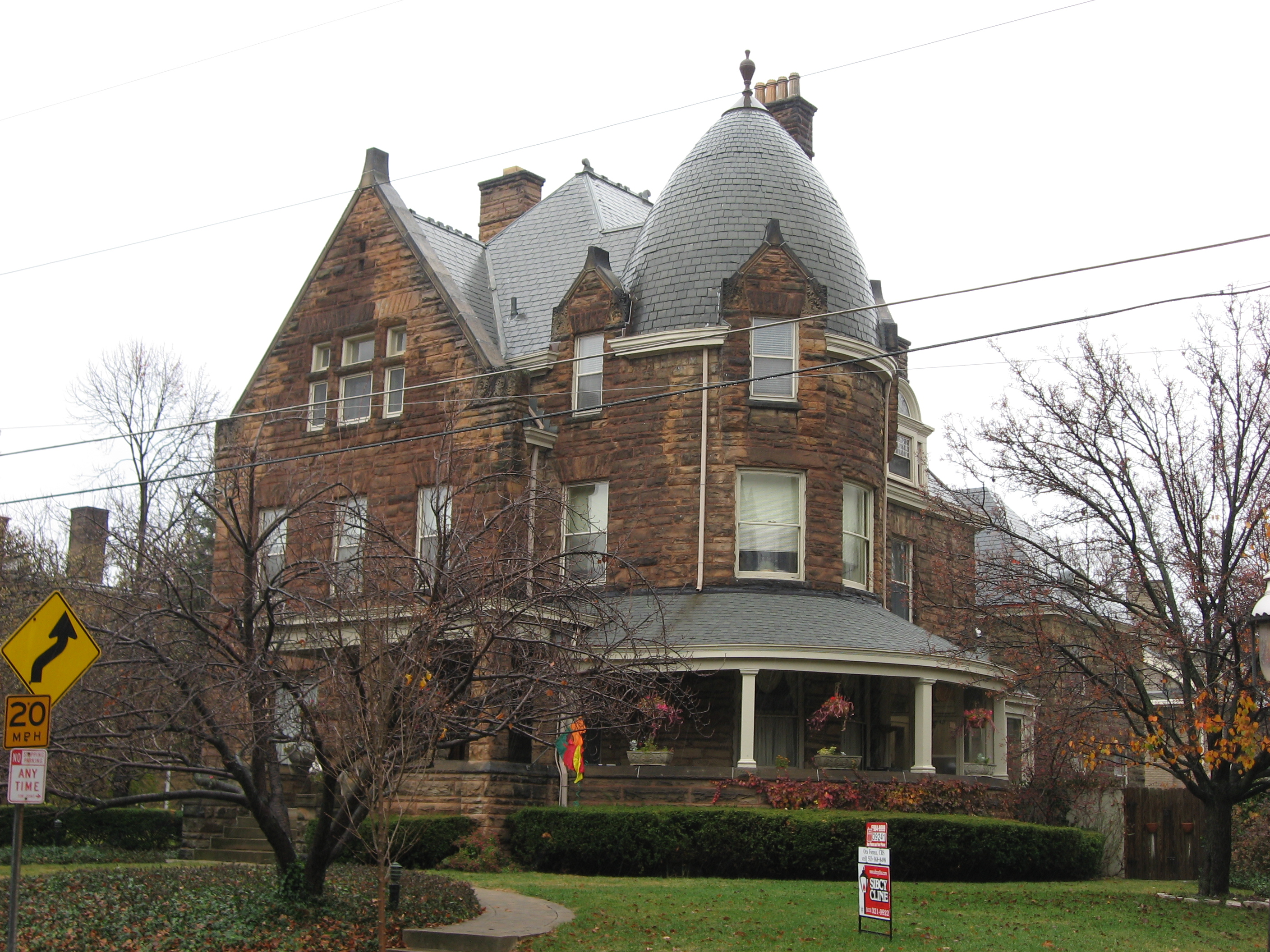
- Front of the house

- Location within Ohio Location within the United States
- Interactive map showing the location of Charles B. Russell House
- Location: 3416 Brookline Ave., Cincinnati, Ohio
- Coordinates: 39°8′35″N 84°30′54″W
- Area: Less than 1 acre (0.40 ha)
- Built: 1890
- Architect: Samuel Hannaford & Sons
- Architectural style: Late Victorian, Victorian Eclectic
- MPS: Samuel Hannaford and Sons TR in Hamilton County
- NRHP reference No.: 80003081
- Added to NRHP: March 3, 1980

The Charles B. Russell House (also known as the "Duffel Building") is a historic residence in the Clifton neighborhood of Cincinnati, Ohio, United States. Built in 1890, it is a large two-and-a-half-story house constructed primarily of limestone. Multiple windows, including several dormer windows, pierce all sides of the turret, while another large dormer window with Palladian influences is present on the house's southern side. A common theme in the design of the house's windows are string courses of stone that connect the windows and voussoirs that radiate out from the windows to many directions. Among its most distinctive architectural elements are the heavy stone front porch, which transitions from a verandah on one end to a sun porch on the other end, and the large circular turret on the front corner of the house, which is capped with a beehive-shaped pinnacle.

Charles B. Russell was a leading Cincinnati businessman, occupying the office of treasurer for the Cincinnati Ice Company, which provided ice both for individual homes and for businesses such as the city's many breweries. Russell's house rests on a stone foundation, its walls are built of coarse, random ashlar blocks, and its roof is slate. This style of construction is common to houses designed by Hannaford during the early 1890s — all five extant stone houses that he designed between 1890 and 1892 feature coarse ashlar walls. During the final years of the nineteenth century, he was responsible for designing many fine residences like the Russell House: many prominent businessmen and politicians of the Gilded Age found his designs highly appealing, and the wealthy neighborhoods of Clifton, Walnut Hills, and Avondale were dotted with grand Hannaford houses.

In the years after Russell moved out of his house, it passed through a succession of owners, starting with attorney Thomas S. Pogue, who purchased the property in 1905. Many of Hannaford's most important designs in the Cincinnati metropolitan area have been destroyed over the course of the twentieth century, but dozens of his buildings yet stand. In late 1978, fifty-five different Hannaford buildings in or around Cincinnati, including the Russell House and nineteen other houses, were nominated as a group to the National Register of Historic Places, and they were officially added to the Register in early 1980. The Russell House qualified for inclusion on the Register due to its historically important architecture, which was deemed to be significant statewide.
