= List of tributaries of Wheeling Creek =

This is a list of tributaries of Wheeling Creek, a tributary of the Ohio River in northern West Virginia in the United States. The creek's watershed also extends into southwestern Pennsylvania. The list is ordered upstream from Wheeling Creek's mouth in Wheeling.

== List of tributaries from West to East ==
Wheeling Creek - Ohio County, West Virginia

- Long Run
  - Waddles Run
  - Pogues Run
- Carter Run
- Little Wheeling Creek - near Elm Grove, West Virginia
  - Peters Run
    - Browns Run
    - Warden Run
  - Middle Wheeling Creek - near Triadelphia, West Virginia
    - Tanyard Run
    - Middle Creek Dam
    - Gillespie Run
    - Marlow Run
    - Orrs Run
      - Hall Run
    - Laidley Run
    - Coulter Run
    - Todd Run
  - McCoy Run
  - Gashell Run
  - Point Run
  - Roneys Point Run
  - Dixon Run
  - Battle Run
  - McGraw Run
- Jakes Run - Marshall County, West Virginia
  - Bull Run
- Britt Run
- Seabright Hollow
- Grandstaff Run
  - Wherry Run
- Cricket Hollow
- Hollidays Run
- Bald Eagle Hollow
- Bruce Run
- Burch Run
  - Big Run
- Stull Run
- Turkey Run
- Wolf Run
  - Granny Run
  - Howard Run
  - Williams Run
    - Bee Tree Run
    - Greathouse Hollow
  - Browns Run
- Dunkard Fork - near Majorsville, West Virginia
  - Stone Coal Run
  - Wharton Run
    - Chaney Run
  - Crabapple Creek
  - North Fork of Dunkard Fork
    - Ryerson Station Reservoir
    - Polly Hollow
    - Kent Run
    - Polen Run
    - Long Run
    - Whitehorn Run
    - Webster Run
    - Job Creek
      - Falling Timber Run
  - South Fork of Dunkard Fork
    - Borney's Run
    - Strawn Hollow
    - Mudlick Fork
      - Hewitt Run
      - Chambers Run
    - Blacks Creek
- Enlow Fork - near Majorsville, West Virginia
  - Spottedtail Run
  - Robinson Fork
    - Beham Run
    - Blockhouse Run
  - Owens Run
  - Templeton Fork
    - Rocky Run
  - Long Run
  - Boothe Run

== Wheeling Creek watershed graph ==
| No. | Tributary Level | | | | |
| No. | 1st | 2nd | 3rd | 4th | 5th |
|---|---|---|---|---|---|
| 1 | Big Wheeling Creek | Long Run | Waddles Run | | |
| --- | Big Wheeling Creek | Long Run | Pogues Run | | |
| 2 | Big Wheeling Creek | Carter Run | | | |
| 3 | Big Wheeling Creek | Little Wheeling Creek | Peters Run | Browns Run | |
| --- | Big Wheeling Creek | Little Wheeling Creek | Peters Run | Warden Run | |
| --- | Big Wheeling Creek | Little Wheeling Creek | Middle Wheeling Creek | Tanyard Run | |
| --- | Big Wheeling Creek | Little Wheeling Creek | Middle Wheeling Creek | Middle Creek Dam | |
| --- | Big Wheeling Creek | Little Wheeling Creek | Middle Wheeling Creek | Gillespie Run | |
| --- | Big Wheeling Creek | Little Wheeling Creek | Middle Wheeling Creek | Marlow Run | |
| --- | Big Wheeling Creek | Little Wheeling Creek | Middle Wheeling Creek | Orrs Run | Hall Run |
| --- | Big Wheeling Creek | Little Wheeling Creek | Middle Wheeling Creek | Laidley Run | |
| --- | Big Wheeling Creek | Little Wheeling Creek | Middle Wheeling Creek | Coulter Run | |
| --- | Big Wheeling Creek | Little Wheeling Creek | Middle Wheeling Creek | Todd Run | |
| --- | Big Wheeling Creek | Little Wheeling Creek | McCoy Run | | |
| --- | Big Wheeling Creek | Little Wheeling Creek | Gashell Run | | |
| --- | Big Wheeling Creek | Little Wheeling Creek | Point Run | | |
| --- | Big Wheeling Creek | Little Wheeling Creek | Roneys Point Run | | |
| --- | Big Wheeling Creek | Little Wheeling Creek | Dixon Run | | |
| --- | Big Wheeling Creek | Little Wheeling Creek | Battle Run | | |
| --- | Big Wheeling Creek | Little Wheeling Creek | McGraw Run | | |
| --- | Big Wheeling Creek | Jakes Run | Bull Run | | |
| 5 | Big Wheeling Creek | Britt Run | | | |
| 6 | Big Wheeling Creek | Seabright Run | | | |
| 7 | Big Wheeling Creek | Grandstaff Hollow | Wherry Run | | |
| 8 | Big Wheeling Creek | Cricket Hollow | | | |
| 9 | Big Wheeling Creek | Hollidays Run | | | |
| 10 | Big Wheeling Creek | Bald Eagle Hollow | | | |
| 11 | Big Wheeling Creek | Bruce Run | | | |
| 12 | Big Wheeling Creek | Burch Run | Big Run | | |
| 13 | Big Wheeling Creek | Still Run | | | |
| 14 | Big Wheeling Creek | Turkey Run | | | |
| 15 | Big Wheeling Creek | Wolf Run | Granny Run | | |
| --- | Big Wheeling Creek | Wolf Run | Howard Run | | |
| --- | Big Wheeling Creek | Wolf Run | Williams Run | Bee Tree Run | |
| --- | Big Wheeling Creek | Wolf Run | Williams Run | Greathouse Hollow | |
| --- | Big Wheeling Creek | Wolf Run | Browns Run | | |
| 16 | Big Wheeling Creek | Dunkard Fork | Stone Coal Run | | |
| --- | Big Wheeling Creek | Dunkard Fork | Chaney Run | Wharton Run | |
| --- | Big Wheeling Creek | Dunkard Fork | Crabapple Creek | | |
| --- | Big Wheeling Creek | Dunkard Fork | North Fork of Dunkard Fork | Ryerson Station; Reservoir | |
| --- | Big Wheeling Creek | Dunkard Fork | North Fork of Dunkard Fork | Polly Hollow | |
| --- | Big Wheeling Creek | Dunkard Fork | North Fork of Dunkard Fork | Kent Run | |
| --- | Big Wheeling Creek | Dunkard Fork | North Fork of Dunkard Fork | Polen Run | |
| --- | Big Wheeling Creek | Dunkard Fork | North Fork of Dunkard Fork | Long Run | |
| --- | Big Wheeling Creek | Dunkard Fork | North Fork of Dunkard Fork | Whitehorn Run | |
| --- | Big Wheeling Creek | Dunkard Fork | North Fork of Dunkard Fork | Webster Run | |
| --- | Big Wheeling Creek | Dunkard Fork | North Fork of Dunkard Fork | Job Creek | Falling Timber Run |
| --- | Big Wheeling Creek | Dunkard Fork | South Fork of Dunkard Fork | Borney's Run | |
| --- | Big Wheeling Creek | Dunkard Fork | South Fork of Dunkard Fork | Strawn Hollow | |
| --- | Big Wheeling Creek | Dunkard Fork | South Fork of Dunkard Fork | Mudlick Fork | Hewitt Run |
| --- | Big Wheeling Creek | Dunkard Fork | South Fork of Dunkard Fork | Mudlick Fork | Chambers Run |
| --- | Big Wheeling Creek | Dunkard Fork | South Fork of Dunkard Fork | Blacks Creek | |
| 17 | Big Wheeling Creek | Enlow Fork | Spottedtail Run | | |
| --- | Big Wheeling Creek | Enlow Fork | Robinson Fork | Beham Run | |
| --- | Big Wheeling Creek | Enlow Fork | Robinson Fork | Blockhouse Run | |
| --- | Big Wheeling Creek | Enlow Fork | Owens Run | | |
| --- | Big Wheeling Creek | Enlow Fork | Templeton Fork | Rocky Run | |
| --- | Big Wheeling Creek | Enlow Fork | Long Run | | |
| --- | Boothe Run | Enlow Fork | | | |

== See also ==
- Rivers of West Virginia
- List of rivers of West Virginia
- List of rivers of Pennsylvania
