= Tanyard Run (Middle Wheeling Creek tributary) =

Stream in West Virginia, USA

Tanyard Run Tributary to Middle Wheeling Creek
- Location of Tanyard Run mouth Tanyard Run (Middle Wheeling Creek tributary) (the United States)

Location
- Country: United States
- State: West Virginia
- County: Ohio

Physical characteristics
- Source: Marlow Run divide
  - location: about 2 miles northeast of Valley Camp, West Virginia
  - coordinates: 40°03′10″N 080°34′59″W
  - elevation: 1,140 ft (350 m)
- Mouth: Middle Wheeling Creek
  - location: Twilight, West Virginia
  - coordinates: 40°02′11″N 080°35′40″W
  - elevation: 784 ft (239 m)
- Length: 1.53 mi (2.46 km)
- Basin size: 1.34 square miles (3.5 km^{2})
- Discharge
  - location: Middle Wheeling Creek
  - average: 1.77 cu ft/s (0.050 m^{3}/s) at mouth with Middle Wheeling Creek

Basin features
- Progression: Middle Wheeling Creek → Little Wheeling Creek → Wheeling Creek → Ohio River → Mississippi River → Gulf of Mexico
- River system: Ohio River
- Tributaries
  - left: unnamed tributaries
  - right: unnamed tributaries
- Bridges: Rising Sun Lane, Middle Creek Road

Tanyard Run is a 1.53 mi (2.46 km) long 1st order tributary to Middle Wheeling Creek in Ohio County, West Virginia.

== Course ==
Tanyard Run rises about 2 miles northeast of Valley Camp, West Virginia, and then flows southwest to join Middle Wheeling Creek at Twilight.

== Watershed ==
Tanyard Run drains 1.33 square miles (3.4 km^{2}) of area, receives about 41.1 in/year of precipitation, has a wetness index of 267.53, and is about 69% forested.

== See also ==
- List of rivers of West Virginia
