= Gashell Run =

Stream in West Virginia, USA

Gashell Run Tributary to Little Wheeling Creek
- Location of Gashell Run mouth Gashell Run (the United States)

Location
- Country: United States
- State: West Virginia
- County: Ohio

Physical characteristics
- Source: Peters Run divide
  - location: about 2.5 miles northwest of Roneys Point, West Virginia
  - coordinates: 40°05′29″N 080°37′14″W
  - elevation: 1,120 ft (340 m)
- Mouth
  - location: Valley Camp, West Virginia
  - coordinates: 40°03′52″N 080°36′22″W
  - elevation: 781 ft (238 m)
- Length: 2.02 mi (3.25 km)
- Basin size: 1.18 square miles (3.1 km^{2})
- Discharge
  - location: Little Wheeling Creek
  - average: 1.53 cu ft/s (0.043 m^{3}/s) at mouth with Little Wheeling Creek

Basin features
- Progression: Little Wheeling Creek → Wheeling Creek → Ohio River → Mississippi River → Gulf of Mexico
- River system: Ohio River
- Tributaries
  - left: unnamed tributaries
  - right: unnamed tributaries
- Bridges: Gashell Run Road, US 40

Gashell Run is a 2.02 mi (3.25 km) long 1st order tributary to Little Wheeling Creek in Ohio County, West Virginia. This is the only stream of this name in the United States.

== Course ==
Gashell Run rises about 2.5 miles northwest of Roneys Point, West Virginia, in Ohio County and then flows southeast to join Little Wheeling Creek at Valley Camp.

== Watershed ==
Gashell Run drains 1.18 square miles (3.1 km^{2}) of area, receives about 41.0 in/year of precipitation, has a wetness index of 275.29, and is about 73% forested.

== See also ==
- List of rivers of West Virginia
