= Hall Run (Orrs Run tributary) =

Stream in West Virginia, USA

Hall Run Tributary to Orrs Run
- Location of Hall Run mouth Hall Run (Orrs Run tributary) (the United States)

Location
- Country: United States
- State: West Virginia
- County: Ohio

Physical characteristics
- Source: Little Wheeling Creek divide
  - location: about 1 mile south-southeast of Valley Grove, West Virginia
  - coordinates: 40°04′41″N 080°33′46″W
  - elevation: 1,250 ft (380 m)
- Mouth: Orrs Run
  - location: about 1.5 miles east-northeast of Camp Giscowhego, West Virginia
  - coordinates: 40°03′17″N 080°33′20″W
  - elevation: 994 ft (303 m)
- Length: 1.75 mi (2.82 km)
- Basin size: 0.98 square miles (2.5 km^{2})
- Discharge
  - location: Orrs Run
  - average: 1.31 cu ft/s (0.037 m^{3}/s) at mouth with Orrs Run

Basin features
- Progression: Orrs Run → Middle Wheeling Creek → Little Wheeling Creek → Wheeling Creek → Ohio River → Mississippi River → Gulf of Mexico
- River system: Ohio River
- Tributaries
  - left: unnamed tributaries
  - right: unnamed tributaries
- Bridges: Hi Park, I-70, Technology Drive, Sample Road

Hall Run is a 1.75 mi (2.82 km) long 1st order tributary to Orrs Run in Ohio County, West Virginia.

== Course ==
Hall Run rises about 2 miles south-southeast of Valley Grove, West Virginia, and then flows southerly to join Orrs Run about 1.5 miles east-northeast of Camp Giscowhego.

== Watershed ==
Hall Run drains 0.98 square miles (2.5 km^{2}) of area, receives about 41.0 in/year of precipitation, has a wetness index of 310.68, and is about 44% forested.

== See also ==
- List of rivers of West Virginia
