= McCoy Run (Little Wheeling Creek tributary) =

Stream in West Virginia, USA

McCoy Run Tributary to Little Wheeling Creek
- Location of McCoy Run mouth McCoy Run (Little Wheeling Creek tributary) (the United States)

Location
- Country: United States
- State: West Virginia
- County: Ohio

Physical characteristics
- Source: Peters Run divide
  - location: about 1 northwest of Valley Camp, West Virginia
  - coordinates: 40°04′50″N 080°37′21″W
  - elevation: 1,100 ft (340 m)
- Mouth: Little Wheeling Creek
  - location: Valley Camp, West Virginia
  - coordinates: 40°03′52″N 080°36′56″W
  - elevation: 781 ft (238 m)
- Length: 1.07 mi (1.72 km)
- Basin size: 0.48 square miles (1.2 km^{2})
- Discharge
  - location: Little Wheeling Creek
  - average: 0.64 cu ft/s (0.018 m^{3}/s) at mouth with Little Wheeling Creek

Basin features
- Progression: Little Wheeling Creek → Wheeling Creek → Ohio River → Mississippi River → Gulf of Mexico
- River system: Ohio River
- Tributaries
  - left: unnamed tributaries
  - right: unnamed tributaries
- Bridges: none

McCoy Run is a 1.07 mi (1.72 km) long 1st order tributary to Little Wheeling Creek in Ohio County, West Virginia.

== Course ==
McCoy Run rises about 1 mi (1.6 km) northwest of Valley Camp, West Virginia, in Ohio County and then flows southeast to join Little Wheeling Creek at Valley Camp.

== Watershed ==
McCoy Run drains 0.48 square miles (1.2 km^{2}) of area, receives about 41.0 in/year of precipitation, has a wetness index of 257.47, and is about 78% forested.

== See also ==
- List of rivers of West Virginia
