= Panhandle coalfield =

Coordinates: 40°10′N 80°33′W

The panhandle coalfield is a coalfield located in the northern panhandle of West Virginia, encompassing the counties of Hancock, Brooke, Ohio, Marshall, and Wetzel. Mining is primarily in the Pittsburgh coal seam, sometimes called the No. 8 seam, which is of a steam rather than metallurgical nature in this region. Currently CONSOL Energy maintains two large mines in this field - Shoemaker (one of the last large mines in America to use rail haulage in the mine) and McElroy. Also, the first new mine in Ohio County in forty years was being developed on Short Creek by Alliance Coal Co. in 2009.

Most coal miners in this coalfield have lived in commercial towns such as Weirton, Wheeling, Benwood, and Moundsville. However, there were a few "coal camp" coal towns, such as Triadelphia, Cliftonville, and Windsor Heights.

The panhandle coalfield was once served by the Baltimore and Ohio Railroad but currently ships most or all of its coal by barge on the Ohio River.

This field could probably be considered to extend into the western parts of Greene County, Pennsylvania and Washington County, Pennsylvania. It could also be grouped with the Pittsburgh No. 8 coalfield across the river in Ohio.

== See also ==
- Pittsburgh coal seam
