= Orrs Run =

Stream in West Virginia, USA

Orrs Run Tributary to Middle Wheeling Creek
- Location of Orrs Run mouth Orrs Run (the United States)

Location
- Country: United States
- State: West Virginia
- County: Ohio

Physical characteristics
- Source: Point Run divide
  - location: pond about 3 miles east-northeast of Roneys Point, West Virginia
  - coordinates: 40°03′57″N 80°33′54″W
  - elevation: 1,250 ft (380 m)
- Mouth: Middle Wheeling Creek
  - location: about 0.25 miles southeast of Camp Giscowhego, West Virginia
  - coordinates: 40°02′43″N 80°33′31″W
  - elevation: 932 ft (284 m)
- Length: 1.75 mi (2.82 km)
- Basin size: 1.63 square miles (4.2 km^{2})
- Discharge
  - location: Middle Wheeling Creek
  - average: 2.15 cu ft/s (0.061 m^{3}/s) at mouth with Middle Wheeling Creek

Basin features
- Progression: Middle Wheeling Creek → Little Wheeling Creek → Wheeling Creek → Ohio River → Mississippi River → Gulf of Mexico
- River system: Ohio River
- Tributaries
  - left: Hall Run
  - right: unnamed tributaries
- Bridges: WV 41, Timber Haven Road

Orrs Run is a 1.75 mi (2.82 km) long 2nd order tributary to Middle Wheeling Creek in Ohio County, West Virginia. This is the only stream of this name in the United States.

== Course ==
Orrs Run rises in a pond about 2 miles east-southeast of Roneys Point, West Virginia, and then flows generally southeast to join Middle Wheeling Creek about 0.25 miles northeast of Camp Giscowhego.

== Watershed ==
Orrs Run drains 1.67 square miles (4.3 km^{2}) of area, receives about 41.1 in/year of precipitation, has a wetness index of 306.78, and is about 46% forested.

== See also ==
- List of rivers of West Virginia
