= Battle Run (Little Wheeling Creek tributary) =

Stream in West Virginia, USA

Battle Run Tributary to Little Wheeling Creek
- Location of Battle Run mouth Battle Run (Little Wheeling Creek tributary) (the United States)

Location
- Country: United States
- State: West Virginia
- County: Ohio

Physical characteristics
- Source: Short Creek divide
  - location: about 1.5 miles east-southeast of Clinton, West Virginia
  - coordinates: 40°07′40″N 080°35′12″W
  - elevation: 1,240 ft (380 m)
- Mouth
  - location: Point Mills, West Virginia
  - coordinates: 40°05′14″N 080°34′14″W
  - elevation: 899 ft (274 m)
- Length: 3.06 mi (4.92 km)
- Basin size: 1.92 square miles (5.0 km^{2})
- Discharge
  - location: Little Wheeling Creek
  - average: 2.46 cu ft/s (0.070 m^{3}/s) at mouth with Little Wheeling Creek

Basin features
- Progression: Little Wheeling Creek → Wheeling Creek → Ohio River → Mississippi River → Gulf of Mexico
- River system: Ohio River
- Tributaries
  - left: unnamed tributaries
  - right: unnamed tributaries
- Bridges: Battle Run Road (x3)

Battle Run is a 3.06 mi (4.92 km) long 1st order tributary to Little Wheeling Creek in Ohio County, West Virginia.

== Course ==
Battle Run rises about 1.5 miles east-southeast of Clinton, West Virginia, in Ohio County and then flows south-southeast to join Little Wheeling Creek at Point Mills, West Virginia.

== Watershed ==
Battle Run drains 1.92 square miles (5.0 km^{2}) of area, receives about 40.9 in/year of precipitation, has a wetness index of 292.99, and is about 63% forested.

== See also ==
- List of rivers of West Virginia
