= Laidley Run =

Stream in West Virginia, USA

Laidley Run Tributary to Middle Wheeling Creek
- Location of Laidley Run mouth Laidley Run (the United States)

Location
- Country: United States
- State: West Virginia; Pennsylvania
- County: Ohio; Washington

Physical characteristics
- Source: unnamed tributary to Robinson Fork divide
  - location: about 2.5 miles northeast of Beham, Pennsylvania
  - coordinates: 40°02′06″N 080°29′29″W
  - elevation: 1,220 ft (370 m)
- Mouth: Middle Wheeling Creek
  - location: about 5 miles north-northwest of Dallas, West Virginia
  - coordinates: 40°02′38″N 080°32′36″W
  - elevation: 948 ft (289 m)
- Length: 3.16 mi (5.09 km)
- Basin size: 4.33 square miles (11.2 km^{2})
- Discharge
  - location: Middle Wheeling Creek
  - average: 5.70 cu ft/s (0.161 m^{3}/s) at mouth with Middle Wheeling Creek

Basin features
- Progression: Middle Wheeling Creek → Little Wheeling Creek → Wheeling Creek → Ohio River → Mississippi River → Gulf of Mexico
- River system: Ohio River
- Tributaries
  - left: unnamed tributaries
  - right: unnamed tributaries
- Bridges: Laidleys Run Road (x2)

Laidley Run is a 3.16 mi (5.09 km) long 2nd order tributary to Middle Wheeling Creek in Ohio County, West Virginia. This is the only stream of this name in the United States.

== Variant names ==
According to the Geographic Names Information System, it has also been known historically as:

- Ladley Run
- Lailly Run

== Course ==
Laidley Run rises about 2.5 miles northeast of Beham, Pennsylvania, and then flows westerly into West Virginia to join Middle Wheeling Creek about 5 miles north-northwest of Dallas.

== Watershed ==
Laidley Run drains 4.33 square miles (11.2 km^{2}) of area, receives about 41.2 in/year of precipitation, has a wetness index of 292.31, and is about 58% forested.

== See also ==
- List of rivers of Pennsylvania
- List of rivers of West Virginia
