= Roneys Point Run =

Stream in West Virginia, USA

Roneys Point Run Tributary to Little Wheeling Creek
- Location of Roneys Point Run mouth Roneys Point Run (the United States)

Location
- Country: United States
- State: West Virginia
- County: Ohio

Physical characteristics
- Source: Peters Run divide
  - location: about 2.5 miles southeast of Clinton, West Virginia
  - coordinates: 40°06′10″N 080°36′51″W
  - elevation: 1,170 ft (360 m)
- Mouth
  - location: Roneys Point, West Virginia
  - coordinates: 40°04′30″N 080°35′53″W
  - elevation: 840 ft (260 m)
- Length: 2.17 mi (3.49 km)
- Basin size: 1.13 square miles (2.9 km^{2})
- Discharge
  - location: Little Wheeling Creek
  - average: 1.48 cu ft/s (0.042 m^{3}/s) at mouth with Little Wheeling Creek

Basin features
- Progression: Little Wheeling Creek → Wheeling Creek → Ohio River → Mississippi River → Gulf of Mexico
- River system: Ohio River
- Tributaries
  - left: unnamed tributaries
  - right: unnamed tributaries
- Bridges: WV 27 (x4)

Roneys Point Run is a 2.17 mi (3.49 km) long 1st order tributary to Little Wheeling Creek in Ohio County, West Virginia. This is the only stream of this name in the United States.

== Course ==
Roneys Point Run rises about 2.5 miles southeast of Clinton, West Virginia, in Ohio County and then flows southeast to join Little Wheeling Creek at Roneys Point.

== Watershed ==
Roneys Point Run drains 1.13 square miles (2.9 km^{2}) of area, receives about 41.0 in/year of precipitation, has a wetness index of 277.80, and is about 81% forested.

== See also ==
- List of rivers of West Virginia
