= Coulter Run =

Stream in West Virginia, US

Coulter Run Tributary to Middle Wheeling Creek
- Location of Coulter Run mouth Coulter Run (the United States)

Location
- Country: United States
- State: West Virginia
- County: Ohio

Physical characteristics
- Source: unnamed tributary to Little Wheeling Creek divide
  - location: about 1.50 miles southeast of Valley Grove, West Virginia
  - coordinates: 40°05′07″N 080°32′42″W
  - elevation: 1,200 ft (370 m)
- Mouth: Middle Wheeling Creek
  - location: about 2 miles northeast of Camp Giscowhego, West Virginia
  - coordinates: 40°03′16″N 080°32′20″W
  - elevation: 971 ft (296 m)
- Length: 2.11 mi (3.40 km)
- Basin size: 1.15 square miles (3.0 km^{2})
- Discharge
  - location: Middle Wheeling Creek
  - average: 1.53 cu ft/s (0.043 m^{3}/s) at mouth with Middle Wheeling Creek

Basin features
- Progression: Middle Wheeling Creek → Little Wheeling Creek → Wheeling Creek → Ohio River → Mississippi River → Gulf of Mexico
- River system: Ohio River
- Tributaries
  - left: unnamed tributaries
  - right: unnamed tributaries
- Bridges: Stoolfire Road, Sample Road, Wildlife Road

Coulter Run is a 2.11 mi (3.40 km) long 1st order tributary to Middle Wheeling Creek in Ohio County, West Virginia. This is the only stream of this name in the United States.

== Course ==
Coulter Run rises about 1.5 miles southeast of Valley Grove, West Virginia, and then flows south-southeast to join Middle Wheeling Creek about 2 miles northeast of Camp Giscowhego.

== Watershed ==
Coulter Run drains 1.15 square miles (3.0 km^{2}) of area, receives about 41.0 in/year of precipitation, has a wetness index of 301.74, and is about 37% forested.

== See also ==
- List of rivers of West Virginia
