= Point Run (Little Wheeling Creek tributary) =

Stream in West Virginia, USA

Point Run Tributary to Little Wheeling Creek
- Location of Point Run mouth Point Run (Little Wheeling Creek tributary) (the United States)

Location
- Country: United States
- State: West Virginia
- County: Ohio

Physical characteristics
- Source: Little Wheeling Creek divide
  - location: about 0.5 miles southeast of Point Mills, West Virginia
  - coordinates: 40°04′54″N 080°34′04″W
  - elevation: 1,160 ft (350 m)
- Mouth
  - location: Roneys Point, West Virginia
  - coordinates: 40°04′24″N 080°35′58″W
  - elevation: 827 ft (252 m)
- Length: 2.08 mi (3.35 km)
- Basin size: 1.44 square miles (3.7 km^{2})
- Discharge
  - location: Little Wheeling Creek
  - average: 1.89 cu ft/s (0.054 m^{3}/s) at mouth with Little Wheeling Creek

Basin features
- Progression: Little Wheeling Creek → Wheeling Creek → Ohio River → Mississippi River → Gulf of Mexico
- River system: Ohio River
- Tributaries
  - left: unnamed tributaries
  - right: unnamed tributaries
- Bridges: WV 41 (x3), US 40

Point Run is a 2.08 mi (3.35 km) long 1st order tributary to Little Wheeling Creek in Ohio County, West Virginia.

== Course ==
Point Run rises about 0.5 miles southeast of Point Mills, West Virginia, in Ohio County and then flows west to join Little Wheeling Creek at Roneys Point.

== Watershed ==
Point Run drains 1.44 square miles (3.7 km^{2}) of area, receives about 41.0 in/year of precipitation, has a wetness index of 284.29, and is about 74% forested.

== See also ==
- List of rivers of West Virginia
