= McGraw Run (Little Wheeling Creek tributary) =

Stream in West Virginia, USA

McGraw Run Tributary to Little Wheeling Creek
- Location of McGraw Run mouth McGraw Run (Little Wheeling Creek tributary) (the United States)

Location
- Country: United States
- State: West Virginia
- County: Ohio

Physical characteristics
- Source: Short Creek divide
  - location: pond about 4 miles south of West Liberty, West Virginia
  - coordinates: 40°08′08″N 080°34′42″W
  - elevation: 1,210 ft (370 m)
- Mouth
  - location: Valley Grove, West Virginia
  - coordinates: 40°05′13″N 080°34′14″W
  - elevation: 908 ft (277 m)
- Length: 3.57 mi (5.75 km)
- Basin size: 3.25 square miles (8.4 km^{2})
- Discharge
  - location: Little Wheeling Creek
  - average: 4.12 cu ft/s (0.117 m^{3}/s) at mouth with Little Wheeling Creek

Basin features
- Progression: Little Wheeling Creek → Wheeling Creek → Ohio River → Mississippi River → Gulf of Mexico
- River system: Ohio River
- Tributaries
  - left: unnamed tributaries
  - right: unnamed tributaries
- Bridges: McGraws Run Road (x2), Quincy Lane, McGraw Run Road, National Road

McGraw Run is a 3.57 mi (5.75 km) long 2nd order tributary to Little Wheeling Creek in Ohio County, West Virginia.

== Course ==
McGraw Run rises in a pond about 4 miles south of West Liberty, West Virginia, in Ohio County and then flows south to join Little Wheeling Creek at Valley Grove.

== Watershed ==
McGraw Run drains 3.25 square miles (8.4 km^{2}) of area, receives about 40.9 in/year of precipitation, has a wetness index of 292.72, and is about 64% forested.

== See also ==
- List of rivers of West Virginia
