= Dixon Run (Little Wheeling Creek tributary) =

Stream in West Virginia, USA

Dixon Run Tributary to Little Wheeling Creek
- Location of Dixon Run mouth Dixon Run (Little Wheeling Creek tributary) (the United States)

Location
- Country: United States
- State: West Virginia
- County: Ohio

Physical characteristics
- Source: Short Creek divide
  - location: about 2 miles southeast of Clinton, West Virginia
  - coordinates: 40°07′00″N 080°35′52″W
  - elevation: 1,180 ft (360 m)
- Mouth
  - location: about 0.5 miles southwest of Point Mills, West Virginia
  - coordinates: 40°04′44″N 080°35′24″W
  - elevation: 863 ft (263 m)
- Length: 2.60 mi (4.18 km)
- Basin size: 1.69 square miles (4.4 km^{2})
- Discharge
  - location: Little Wheeling Creek
  - average: 2.18 cu ft/s (0.062 m^{3}/s) at mouth with Little Wheeling Creek

Basin features
- Progression: Little Wheeling Creek → Wheeling Creek → Ohio River → Mississippi River → Gulf of Mexico
- River system: Ohio River
- Tributaries
  - left: unnamed tributaries
  - right: unnamed tributaries
- Bridges: Quiet Acres Ext., Dixons Run Road

Dixon Run is a 2.62 mi (4.22 km) long 1st order tributary to Little Wheeling Creek in Ohio County, West Virginia.

== Course ==
Dixon Run rises about 2 miles southeast of Clinton, West Virginia, in Ohio County and then flows southeast to join Little Wheeling Creek about 0.5 miles southwest of Point Mills.

== Watershed ==
Dixon Run drains 1.69 square miles (4.4 km^{2}) of area, receives about 40.9 in/year of precipitation, has a wetness index of 282.60, and is about 82% forested.

== See also ==
- List of rivers of West Virginia
