= Marlow Run =

Stream in West Virginia, USA

Marlow Run Tributary to Middle Wheeling Creek
- Location of Marlow Run mouth Marlow Run (the United States)

Location
- Country: United States
- State: West Virginia
- County: Ohio

Physical characteristics
- Source: Point Run divide
  - location: about 2 miles southeast of Roneys Point, West Virginia
  - coordinates: 40°03′47″N 080°34′56″W
  - elevation: 1,130 ft (340 m)
- Mouth: Middle Wheeling Creek
  - location: about 4 miles southeast of Roneys Point, West Virginia
  - coordinates: 40°02′43″N 080°33′56″W
  - elevation: 925 ft (282 m)
- Length: 1.42 mi (2.29 km)
- Basin size: 1.01 square miles (2.6 km^{2})
- Discharge
  - location: Middle Wheeling Creek
  - average: 1.35 cu ft/s (0.038 m^{3}/s) at mouth with Middle Wheeling Creek

Basin features
- Progression: Middle Wheeling Creek → Little Wheeling Creek → Wheeling Creek → Ohio River → Mississippi River → Gulf of Mexico
- River system: Ohio River
- Tributaries
  - left: unnamed tributaries
  - right: unnamed tributaries
- Bridges: Timber Harvest Road

Marlow Run is a 1.42 mi (2.29 km) long 1st order tributary to Middle Wheeling Creek in Ohio County, West Virginia.

== Course ==
Marlow Run rises about 2 miles southeast of Roneys Point, West Virginia, and then flows southeast to join Middle Wheeling Creek about 4 miles southeast of Roneys Point.

== Watershed ==
Marlow Run drains 1.01 square miles (2.6 km^{2}) of area, receives about 41.1 in/year of precipitation, has a wetness index of 273.33, and is about 72% forested.

== See also ==
- List of rivers of West Virginia
