= Long Run (Wheeling Creek tributary) =

Stream in West Virginia, USA

Long Run Tributary to Wheeling Creek
- Location of Long Run mouth Long Run (Wheeling Creek tributary) (the United States)

Location
- Country: United States
- State: West Virginia
- County: Ohio
- City: Wheeling

Physical characteristics
- Source: Short Creek divide
  - location: about 2 miles west of Clinton, West Virginia
  - coordinates: 40°07′22″N 080°39′24″W
  - elevation: 1,100 ft (340 m)
- Mouth: Wheeling Creek
  - location: Wheeling, West Virginia
  - coordinates: 40°01′36″N 080°43′38″W
  - elevation: 640 ft (200 m)
- Length: 4.35 mi (7.00 km)
- Basin size: 6.90 square miles (17.9 km^{2})
- Discharge
  - location: Wheeling Creek
  - average: 8.18 cu ft/s (0.232 m^{3}/s) at mouth with Wheeling Creek

Basin features
- Progression: Wheeling Creek → Ohio River → Mississippi River → Gulf of Mexico
- River system: Ohio River
- Tributaries
  - left: unnamed tributaries
  - right: Pogue Run; Waddles Run
- Bridges: Shawnee Road, Pearson Drive, WV 7, WV 13, WV 7, Washington Farms, Bryan Drive, Wells Street, WV 88 (x2), Park Road, Homestead Avenue, US 40

Long Run is a 4.35 mi (7.00 km) long 2nd order tributary to Wheeling Creek in Ohio County, West Virginia.

== Variant names ==
According to the Geographic Names Information System, it has also been known historically as:

- Woods Run

== Course ==
Long Run rises about 2 miles west of Clinton, West Virginia, in Ohio County and then flows southwest to Wheeling Creek at Wheeling.

== Watershed ==
Long Run drains 6.90 square miles (17.9 km^{2}) of area, receives about 40.5 in/year of precipitation, has a wetness index of 298.89, and is about 53% forested.

== See also ==
- List of rivers of West Virginia
