= Gillespie Run (Middle Wheeling Creek tributary) =

Stream in West Virginia, USA

Gillespie Run Tributary to Middle Wheeling Creek
- Location of Gillespie Run mouth Gillespie Run (Middle Wheeling Creek tributary) (the United States)

Location
- Country: United States
- State: West Virginia; Pennsylvania
- County: Ohio; Washington

Physical characteristics
- Source: Beham Run divide
  - location: about 0.25 miles northwest of Beham, Pennsylvania
  - coordinates: 40°01′37″N 080°30′52″W
  - elevation: 1,190 ft (360 m)
- Mouth: Middle Wheeling Creek
  - location: about 0.5 miles south of Camp Giscowhego, West Virginia
  - coordinates: 40°02′07″N 080°33′45″W
  - elevation: 909 ft (277 m)
- Length: 2.95 mi (4.75 km)
- Basin size: 3.37 square miles (8.7 km^{2})
- Discharge
  - location: Middle Wheeling Creek
  - average: 4.49 cu ft/s (0.127 m^{3}/s) at mouth with Middle Wheeling Creek

Basin features
- Progression: Middle Wheeling Creek → Little Wheeling Creek → Wheeling Creek → Ohio River → Mississippi River → Gulf of Mexico
- River system: Ohio River
- Tributaries
  - left: unnamed tributaries
  - right: unnamed tributaries
- Bridges: Dallas Pike, Oklahoma Road

Gillespie Run is a 2.95 mi (4.75 km) long 2nd order tributary to Middle Wheeling Creek in Ohio County, West Virginia.

== Variant names ==
According to the Geographic Names Information System, it has also been known historically as:

- Gillaspies Run
- Gillespie Creek
- Glasby Creek
- Glyspie Run

== Course ==
Gillespie Run rises about 0.25 miles northwest of Beham, Pennsylvania, and then flows west-northwesterly to join Middle Wheeling Creek about 0.5 miles south of Camp Giscowhego.

== Watershed ==
Gillespie Run drains 3.37 square miles (8.7 km^{2}) of area, receives about 41.3 in/year of precipitation, has a wetness index of 280.65, and is about 70% forested.

== See also ==
- List of rivers of West Virginia
