= Browns Run (Peters Run tributary) =

Stream in West Virginia, USA

Browns Run Tributary to Peters Run
- Location of Browns Run mouth Browns Run (Peters Run tributary) (the United States)

Location
- Country: United States
- State: West Virginia
- County: Ohio

Physical characteristics
- Source: Waddles Run divide
  - location: pond about 2.5 miles northeast of Wheeling, West Virginia
  - coordinates: 40°05′20″N 080°39′00″W
  - elevation: 1,160 ft (350 m)
- Mouth: Peters Run
  - location: Eden, West Virginia
  - coordinates: 40°03′59″N 080°38′18″W
  - elevation: 830 ft (250 m)
- Length: 1.96 mi (3.15 km)
- Basin size: 1.37 square miles (3.5 km^{2})
- Discharge
  - location: Peters Run
  - average: 1.76 cu ft/s (0.050 m^{3}/s) at mouth with Peters Run

Basin features
- Progression: Peters Run → Little Wheeling Creek → Wheeling Creek → Ohio River → Mississippi River → Gulf of Mexico
- River system: Ohio River
- Tributaries
  - left: unnamed tributaries
  - right: unnamed tributaries
- Bridges: Browns Run Road (x4), Peters Run Road

Browns Run is a 1.91 mi (3.07 km) long 2nd order tributary to Peters Run in Ohio County, West Virginia.

== Variant names ==
According to the Geographic Names Information System, it has also been known historically as:

- Brown's Run

== Course ==
Browns Run rises in a pond about 2.5 miles northeast of Wheeling, West Virginia, in Ohio County and then flows southeast to Peters Run at Eden.

== Watershed ==
Browns Run drains 1.37 square miles (3.5 km^{2}) of area, receives about 41.0 in/year of precipitation, has a wetness index of 275.95, and is about 58% forested.

== See also ==
- List of rivers of West Virginia
