= Todd Run (Middle Wheeling Creek tributary) =

Stream in West Virginia, USA

Todd Run Tributary to Middle Wheeling Creek
- Location of Todd Run mouth Todd Run (Middle Wheeling Creek tributary) (the United States)

Location
- Country: United States
- State: West Virginia
- County: Ohio

Physical characteristics
- Source: Little Wheeling Creek divide
  - location: about 1.50 miles southwest of West Alexander, Pennsylvania
  - coordinates: 40°05′32″N 080°31′55″W
  - elevation: 1,230 ft (370 m)
- Mouth: Middle Wheeling Creek
  - location: about 2.5 miles northeast of Camp Giscowhego, West Virginia
  - coordinates: 40°03′34″N 080°31′48″W
  - elevation: 974 ft (297 m)
- Length: 2.39 mi (3.85 km)
- Basin size: 1.33 square miles (3.4 km^{2})
- Discharge
  - location: Middle Wheeling Creek
  - average: 1.82 cu ft/s (0.052 m^{3}/s) at mouth with Middle Wheeling Creek

Basin features
- Progression: Middle Wheeling Creek → Little Wheeling Creek → Wheeling Creek → Ohio River → Mississippi River → Gulf of Mexico
- River system: Ohio River
- Tributaries
  - left: unnamed tributaries
  - right: unnamed tributaries
- Bridges: Tuzgoot Lane, Bear Rock Road, Wildlife Road

Todd Run is a 2.39 mi (3.85 km) long 1st order tributary to Middle Wheeling Creek in Ohio County, West Virginia.

== Course ==
Todd Run rises about 1.5 miles southwest of West Alexander, Pennsylvania and then flows south-southeast to join Middle Wheeling Creek about 2.5 miles northeast of Camp Giscowhego.

== Watershed ==
Todd Run drains 1.33 square miles (3.4 km^{2}) of area, receives about 41.0 in/year of precipitation, has a wetness index of 318.46, and is about 56% forested.

== See also ==
- List of rivers of West Virginia
