= Newlands Run =

Stream in West Virginia, USA

Newlands Run Tributary to Girty Run
- Location of Newlands Run mouth Newlands Run (the United States)

Location
- Country: United States
- State: West Virginia
- County: Brooke

Physical characteristics
- Source: Grog Run divide
  - location: about 1.5 miles east-southeast of Power, West Virginia
  - coordinates: 40°12′20″N 080°38′06″W
  - elevation: 1,098 ft (335 m)
- Mouth: Girty Run
  - location: about 0.5 miles east of Windsor Heights, West Virginia
  - coordinates: 40°11′09″N 080°39′11″W
  - elevation: 755 ft (230 m)
- Length: 1.70 mi (2.74 km)
- Basin size: 1.42 square miles (3.7 km^{2})
- Discharge
  - location: Girty Run
  - average: 1.69 cu ft/s (0.048 m^{3}/s) at mouth with Girty Run

Basin features
- Progression: Girty Run → Short Creek → Ohio River → Mississippi River → Gulf of Mexico
- River system: Ohio River
- Tributaries
  - left: unnamed tributaties
  - right: unnamed tributaries
- Bridges: WV 30

Newlands Run is a 1.70 mi (2.74 km) long 1st order tributary to Girty Run in Brooke County, West Virginia. This is the only stream of this name in the United States.

== Course ==
Newlands Run rises about 1.5 miles east-southeast of Power, West Virginia, and then flows southwest to join Girty Run about 0.5 miles east of Windsor Heights.

== Watershed ==
Newlands Run drains 1.42 square miles (3.7 km^{2}) of area, receives about 40.0 in/year of precipitation, has a wetness index of 292.90, and is about 66% forested.

== See also ==
- List of rivers of West Virginia
