= Girty Run =

Stream in West Virginia, USA

Girty Run Tributary to Short Creek
- Location of Girty Run mouth Girty Run (the United States)

Location
- Country: United States
- State: West Virginia
- County: Brooke
- City: Short Creek

Physical characteristics
- Source: Hogtan Run divide
  - location: pond about 2.5 miles east of Windsor Heights, West Virginia
  - coordinates: 40°11′31″N 080°37′43″W
  - elevation: 1,110 ft (340 m)
- Mouth: Ohio River
  - location: Short Creek, West Virginia
  - coordinates: 40°11′08″N 80°39′47″W
  - elevation: 659 ft (201 m)
- Length: 2.07 mi (3.33 km)
- Basin size: 2.75 square miles (7.1 km^{2})
- Discharge
  - location: Short Creek
  - average: 3.22 cu ft/s (0.091 m^{3}/s) at mouth with Short Creek

Basin features
- Progression: Short Creek → Ohio River → Mississippi River → Gulf of Mexico
- River system: Ohio River
- Tributaries
  - left: unnamed tributaries
  - right: Newlands Run
- Bridges: Bg Lane, Simon Lane, Wainwright Street

Girty Run is a stream in the U.S. state of West Virginia.

Girty Run most likely has the name of Simon Girty (1741–1818), an American colonial.

== See also ==
- List of rivers of West Virginia
