= Browns Run =

Browns Run may refer to:

- Browns Run (Peters Run tributary), Ohio County, West Virginia
- Browns Run (South Fork Tenmile Creek tributary), Pennsylvania
