= Waddles Run (Long Run tributary) =

Stream in West Virginia, USA

Waddles Run Tributary to Long Run
- Location of Waddles Run mouth Waddles Run (Long Run tributary) (the United States)

Location
- Country: United States
- State: West Virginia
- County: Ohio

Physical characteristics
- Source: Pogue Run divide
  - location: pond about 2.5 miles northeast of Greggsville, West Virginia
  - coordinates: 40°06′18″N 080°38′54″W
  - elevation: 1,120 ft (340 m)
- Mouth: Long Run
  - location: Greggsville, West Virginia
  - coordinates: 40°05′20″N 080°41′23″W
  - elevation: 722 ft (220 m)
- Length: 2.86 mi (4.60 km)
- Basin size: 2.27 square miles (5.9 km^{2})
- Discharge
  - location: Long Run
  - average: 2.81 cu ft/s (0.080 m^{3}/s) at mouth with Long Run

Basin features
- Progression: Long Run → Wheeling Creek → Ohio River → Mississippi River → Gulf of Mexico
- River system: Ohio River
- Tributaries
  - left: unnamed tributaries
  - right: unnamed tributaries
- Bridges: Waddles Run Road (x3), WV 88

Waddles Run is a 2.86 mi (4.60 km) long 1st order tributary to Long Run in Ohio County, West Virginia.

== Course ==
Waddles Run rises in a pond about 2.5 miles northeast of Greggsville, West Virginia, in Ohio County and then flows southwest to Long Run at Greggsville.

== Watershed ==
Waddles Run drains 2.27 square miles (5.9 km^{2}) of area, receives about 40.6 in/year of precipitation, has a wetness index of 293.39, and is about 38% forested.

== See also ==
- List of rivers of West Virginia
