= Stone Tavern at Roney's Point =

- U.S. National Register of Historic Places
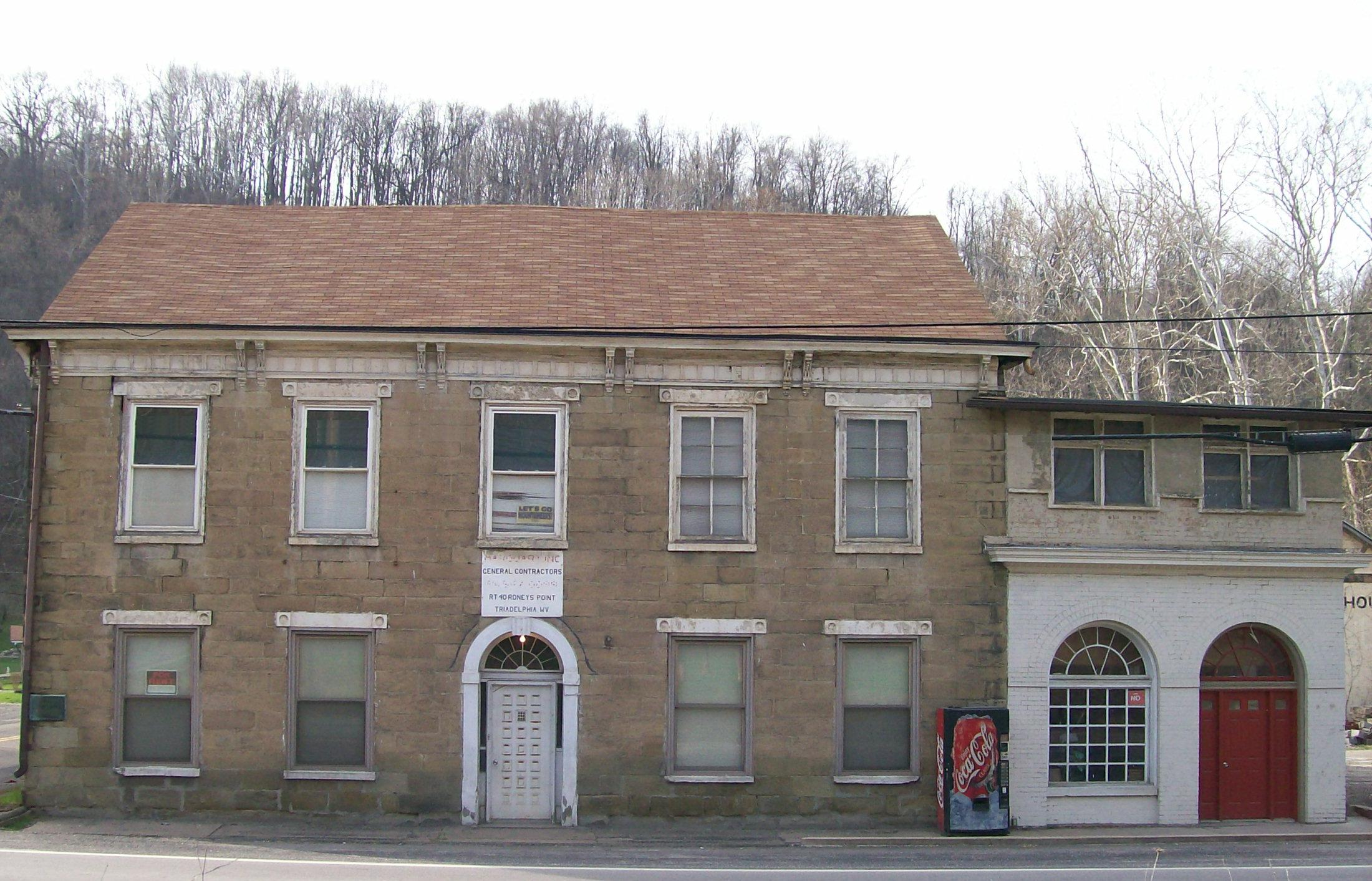
- Stone Tavern at Roney's Point, May 2010

- Location within West Virginia Location within the United States
- Location: Jct. of E. National and Roney's Point Rds., Roney's Point, West Virginia
- Coordinates: 40°4′25″N 80°35′57″W
- Area: 3 acres (1.2 ha)
- Built: 1922
- Architectural style: Colonial Revival, Federal
- MPS: National Road MPS
- NRHP reference No.: 92000864
- Added to NRHP: February 11, 1993

Stone Tavern at Roney's Point is a historic inn and tavern complex located at Roney's Point, Ohio County, West Virginia. It includes an early 19th-century stone tavern and early 20th-century auto camp. The tavern is Federal in style, having an I house form, with later Italianate details added in the 1870s. It is built of sandstone and a two-story brick wing was added in the 1920s. The auto court, known as the Stone House Auto Court, was built in 1922. The remaining building is one story, with 10 units and a lower level garage. It is built of square tile block and coated in stucco.

It was listed on the National Register of Historic Places in 1993.
