= David Stewart Farm =

Historic house in West Virginia, United States

- U.S. National Register of Historic Places
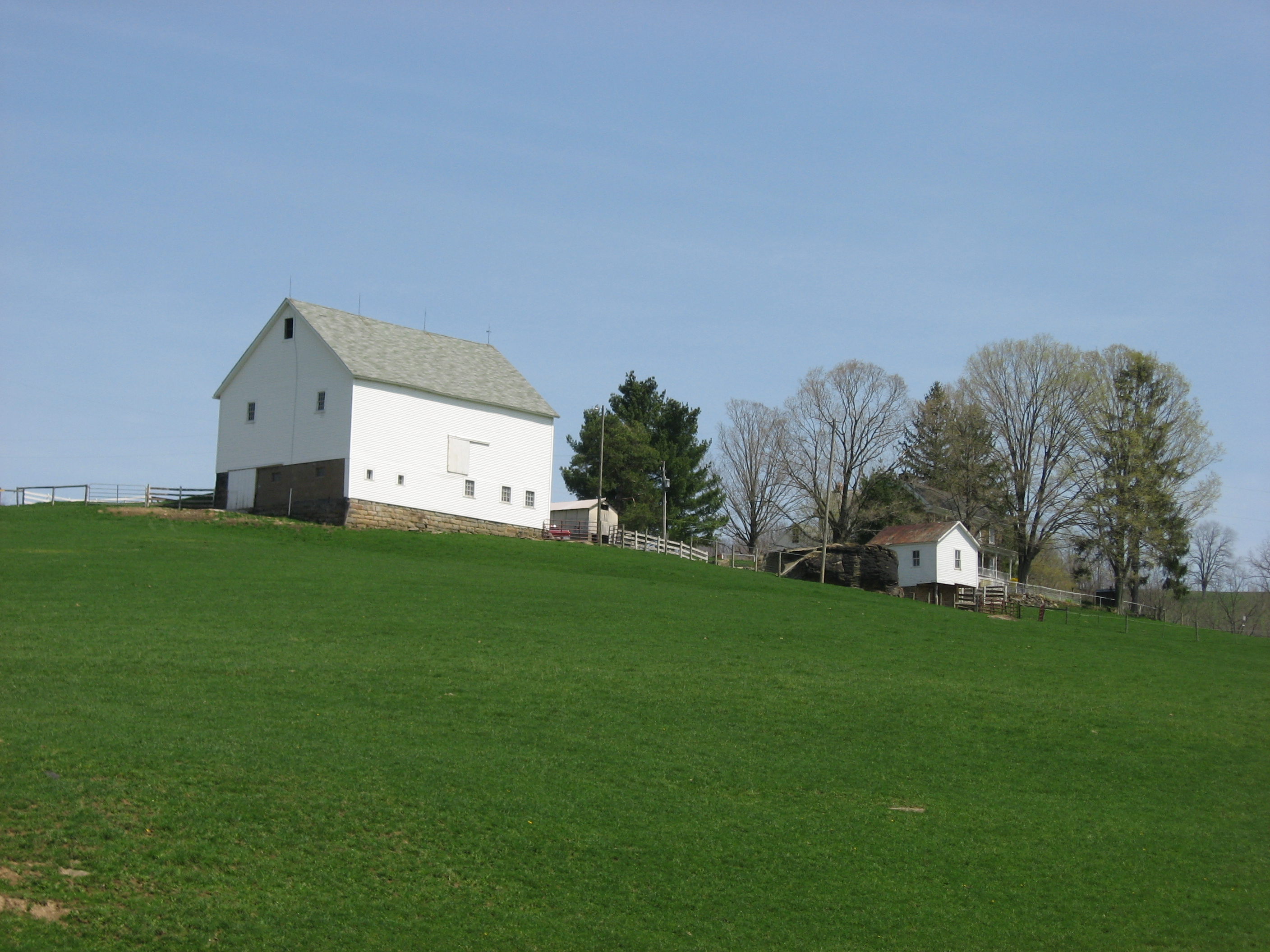
- David Stewart Farm, April 2011

- Location within West Virginia Location within the United States
- Location: Dallas Pike, County Route 43, near Triadelphia, West Virginia
- Coordinates: 40°1′28″N 80°31′55″W
- Area: 5 acres (2.0 ha)
- Built: 1812
- Built by: James and David Stewart
- NRHP reference No.: 79002594
- Added to NRHP: May 29, 1979

David Stewart Farm, also known as Rock Valley Farm, is a historic house and farm located near Triadelphia, Ohio County, West Virginia. The main house was built about 1812, and is a two-story sandstone dwelling. It is a rectangular, single pile, center-hall structure. Also on the property are a sandstone spring house with workshop above, corncrib, washhouse, and old barn.

It was listed on the National Register of Historic Places in 1979.
