= Windsor Heights =

Windsor Heights may refer to a place in the United States:

- Windsor Heights, Iowa
- Windsor Heights, West Virginia
