= Middle Wheeling Creek =

Stream in West Virginia, United States

Middle Wheeling Creek Tributary to Little Wheeling Creek
- Location of Middle Wheeling Creek mouth Middle Wheeling Creek (the United States)

Location
- Country: United States
- State: West Virginia
- County: Ohio
- Town: Triadelphia

Physical characteristics
- Source: Bonar Creek divide
  - location: about 3 miles southwest of Claysville, Pennsylvania
  - coordinates: 40°05′08″N 080°26′58″W
  - elevation: 1,250 ft (380 m)
- Mouth: Little Wheeling Creek
  - location: Triadelphia, West Virginia
  - coordinates: 40°02′51″N 080°38′04″W
  - elevation: 725 ft (221 m)
- Length: 15.11 mi (24.32 km)
- Basin size: 34.36 square miles (89.0 km^{2})
- Discharge
  - location: Little Wheeling Creek
  - average: 41.90 cu ft/s (1.186 m^{3}/s) at mouth with Little Wheeling Creek

Basin features
- Progression: Little Wheeling Creek → Wheeling Creek → Ohio River → Mississippi River → Gulf of Mexico
- River system: Ohio River
- Tributaries
  - left: Laidley Run; Gillespie Run
  - right: Todd Run; Coulter Run; Orrs Run; Marlow Run; Tanyard Run
- Bridges: McGuffey Road, Memorial Road, McGuffey Road, Middle Creek Road, Erskine Road, Laidley Run Road, Dallas Pike, Gillespie Road, Middle Creek Road, Ford Street, I-70, Ferrell Avenue

Middle Wheeling Creek is a 15.11 mi (24.32 km) long 3rd order tributary to Little Wheeling Creek in Ohio County, West Virginia.

== Course ==
Middle Wheeling Creek rises about 3 miles southwest of Claysville, Pennsylvania, in Washington County and then flows west into Ohio County, West Virginia to join Little Wheeling Creek in Triadelphia.

== Watershed ==
Middle Wheeling Creek drains 34.36 square miles (89.0 km^{2}) of area, receives about 41.1 in/year of precipitation, has a wetness index of 295.46, and is about 61% forested.

== See also ==
- List of rivers of Pennsylvania
- List of rivers of West Virginia
