= West Virginia Panhandle =

West Virginia Panhandle may refer to:

- Eastern panhandle of West Virginia, a region bordering Maryland and Virginia
- Northern panhandle of West Virginia, a smaller region bordering Ohio and Pennsylvania
