= Mount Echo, West Virginia =

Mount Echo
- Unincorporated community
- Location within the state of West Virginia Mount Echo (the United States)
- Coordinates: 40°6′8″N 80°31′46″W
- Country: United States
- State: West Virginia
- County: Ohio
- Time zone: UTC-5 (Eastern (EST))
  - Summer (DST): UTC-4 (EDT)
- GNIS feature ID: 1555167

Mount Echo is an unincorporated community in Ohio County, West Virginia, United States. Mount Echo is located along Little Wheeling Creek on the National Road (U.S. Route 40) near the Pennsylvania state line. It is part of the Wheeling, West Virginia Metropolitan Statistical Area.
