= Betty Zane, West Virginia =

Unincorporated community in West Virginia, United States

Betty Zane
- Unincorporated community
- Location within the state of West Virginia Betty Zane (the United States)
- Coordinates: 40°8′36″N 80°39′44″W
- Country: United States
- State: West Virginia
- County: Ohio
- Time zone: UTC-5 (Eastern (EST))
  - Summer (DST): UTC-4 (EDT)
- GNIS feature ID: 1553877

Betty Zane is an unincorporated community in Ohio County, West Virginia, United States. It is located to the east of the village of Clearview. The town is named after Betty Zane, who is believed to have saved Fort Henry by fetching gunpowder and ammunition while under siege during the American Revolutionary War.
