= Bob Milliken =

American baseball player (1926-2007)

- Topps baseball card, 1953 Series #221
- Pitcher
- Born: August 25, 1926; Majorsville, West Virginia, U.S.
- Died: January 3, 2007 (aged 80); Clearwater, Florida, U.S.
- Batted: Right Threw: Right

MLB debut
- April 22, 1953, for the Brooklyn Dodgers

Last MLB appearance
- July 29, 1954, for the Brooklyn Dodgers

MLB statistics
- Win–loss record: 13–6
- Earned run average: 3.59
- Strikeouts: 90
- Stats at Baseball Reference

Teams
- Brooklyn Dodgers (1953–1954)

Career highlights and awards
- World Series champion (1967)

Robert Fogle Milliken (August 25, 1926 – January 3, 2007) was an American reliever and spot starter in Major League Baseball who played for the Brooklyn Dodgers (1953–54). Milliken batted and threw right-handed. He was born in Majorsville, West Virginia.

Milliken pitched in the minor leagues with Fort Worth (1948–49) and Montreal (1950) before joining the military from 1951 to 1952. After being discharged, he helped the Brooklyn Dodgers to clinch the 1953 National League pennant with an 8–4 mark, 65 strikeouts, 117 innings, and a 3.37 ERA in 37 appearances, including 10 starts. He faced the New York Yankees in the World Series of that year and pitched two innings of shutout relief. In 1954 he went 5–2 with two saves in 24 games, three as a starter, as he recorded a 4.02 ERA in a league where the pitchers averaged 4.07. After that, he suffered arm problems and did not return to the major leagues.

From 1955 to 1956 Milliken divided his playing time between Fort Worth and Montreal. Following his playing retirement, he returned to the majors as a batting practice pitcher (1963–1964) and bullpen and pitching coach with the St. Louis Cardinals (1965–70, 1976). He is given credit in the SABR biography of Jim Willoughby for straightening out his delivery in 1975, while Milliken served as the Redbirds' minor-league pitching instructor and Willoughby was with the Triple-A Tulsa Oilers. Later, he was a St. Louis scout.

In 61 major league appearances, Milliken posted a 13–6 record with a 3.59 ERA, four saves, and 90 strikeouts in 180 1/3 innings, including 13 starts and three complete games.

Milliken died in Clearwater, Florida, at the age of 80. According to his obituary, he had spent 58 years in baseball.

== See also ==
- List of St. Louis Cardinals coaches

Preceded by Barney Schultz	St. Louis Cardinals pitching coach 1976	Succeeded by Claude Osteen
