= Peters Run (Little Wheeling Creek tributary) =

Stream in West Virginia, United States

Peters Run Tributary to Little Wheeling Creek
- Location of Peters Run mouth Peters Run (Little Wheeling Creek tributary) (the United States)

Location
- Country: United States
- State: West Virginia
- County: Ohio
- City: Wheeling

Physical characteristics
- Source: Short Creek divide
  - location: about 1 mile south of Clinton, West Virginia
  - coordinates: 40°06′47″N 080°36′54″W
  - elevation: 1,160 ft (350 m)
- Mouth: Little Wheeling Creek
  - location: Wheeling, West Virginia
  - coordinates: 40°02′54″N 080°38′33″W
  - elevation: 702 ft (214 m)
- Length: 4.38 mi (7.05 km)
- Basin size: 6.25 square miles (16.2 km^{2})
- Discharge
  - location: Little Wheeling Creek
  - average: 7.71 cu ft/s (0.218 m^{3}/s) at mouth with Little Wheeling Creek

Basin features
- Progression: Little Wheeling Creek → Wheeling Creek → Ohio River → Mississippi River → Gulf of Mexico
- River system: Ohio River
- Tributaries
  - left: unnamed tributaries
  - right: Warden Run; Browns Run
- Bridges: Stewarts Hill Road, Weisman Lane, National Road

Peters Run is a 4.38 mi (7.05 km) long 3rd order tributary to Little Wheeling Creek in Ohio County, West Virginia.

== Variant names ==
According to the Geographic Names Information System, it has also been known historically as:

- Peter's Run
- Peters Creek

== Course ==
Peters Run rises about 1 mile south of Clinton, West Virginia, in Ohio County and then flows south-southwest to join Little Wheeling Creek in the Elm Grove neighborhood of Wheeling.

== Watershed ==
Peters Run drains 6.25 square miles (16.2 km^{2}) of area, receives about 40.9 in/year of precipitation, has a wetness index of 281.81, and is about 67% forested.

== See also ==
- List of rivers of West Virginia
