= Eden, Ohio County, West Virginia =

Unincorporated community in West Virginia, United States

Eden
- Unincorporated community
- Location within the state of West Virginia Eden (the United States)
- Coordinates: 40°4′1″N 80°38′18″W
- Country: United States
- State: West Virginia
- County: Ohio
- Time zone: UTC-5 (Eastern (EST))
  - Summer (DST): UTC-4 (EDT)

Eden is an unincorporated community in Ohio County, West Virginia, United States. It lies at an elevation of 797 feet (243 m).
