= Potomac, West Virginia =

Unincorporated community in West Virginia, US

Coordinates: 40°09′10″N 80°31′45″W

Potomac is an unincorporated community in Ohio County, in the U.S. state of West Virginia.

== History ==
A post office called Potomac was established in 1872, and remained in operation until 1902. Despite its name, the community is not located on the Potomac River.
