= Greggsville, West Virginia =

Greggsville
- Unincorporated community
- Location within the state of West Virginia Greggsville (the United States)
- Coordinates: 40°05′21″N 80°41′16″W
- Country: United States
- State: West Virginia
- County: Ohio
- Time zone: UTC-5 (Eastern (EST))
  - Summer (DST): UTC-4 (EDT)

Greggsville, also known as Greggs, is an unincorporated community located in Ohio County, West Virginia, United States.

== Geography ==
Greggsville is located at an elevation of 741 feet (226 m).

== Notable people ==
- Gunnery Sergeant Gerald L. Leighton, United States Marine Corps, Retired
- Chief Petty Officer Michael Leighton, United States Navy, Retired. Michael Leighton was also the first resident of West Virginia to ride a bicycle from coast to coast, starting in Seattle, Washington and finishing 47 days later in Atlantic City, New Jersey as part of the 1988 A.L.A. Trans America bicycle trek.
