= Stull Run =

Stream in West Virginia, U.S.

Coordinates: 39°57′32″N 80°35′55″W

Stull Run is a stream in the U.S. state of West Virginia.

Stull Run is named after a local pioneer who was ambushed and killed by Indians.

== See also ==
- List of rivers of West Virginia
