= Dallas, West Virginia =

Unincorporated community in West Virginia, United States

Dallas
- Unincorporated community
- Location within the state of West Virginia Dallas (the United States)
- Coordinates: 40°0′58″N 80°31′37″W
- Country: United States
- State: West Virginia
- County: Marshall
- Time zone: UTC-5 (Eastern (EST))
  - Summer (DST): UTC-4 (EDT)
- ZIP codes: 26036

Dallas (also Haney, Haney Town, or West Union) is an unincorporated community in northeastern Marshall County, West Virginia, United States. It lies along local roads northeast of the city of Moundsville, the county seat of Marshall County, and almost in Pennsylvania. Its elevation is 1,388 feet (423 m). It has a post office with the ZIP code 26036.

The name Dallas most likely is derived from the name of a local settler.

Several properties in the town and the Dallas United Methodist Church are technically in Ohio County (district of Triadelphia). Most of the properties in the village and the surrounding community are located in Marshall County (district of Sand Hill).
