= Clearview, West Virginia =

Village in West Virginia, US

- Village
- Location of Clearview in Ohio County, West Virginia.
- Coordinates: 40°8′32″N 80°41′27″W
- Country: United States
- State: West Virginia
- County: Ohio

Area
  - Total: 0.41 sq mi (1.05 km^{2})
  - Land: 0.41 sq mi (1.05 km^{2})
  - Water: 0 sq mi (0.00 km^{2})
- Elevation: 1,093 ft (333 m)

Population (2020)
  - Total: 472
  - Density: 1,191.6/sq mi (460.08/km^{2})
- Time zone: UTC-5 (Eastern (EST))
  - Summer (DST): UTC-4 (EDT)
- Area code: 304
- FIPS code: 54-15916
- GNIS feature ID: 1537397
- Website: https://local.wv.gov/clearview/Pages/default.aspx

Clearview is a village in Ohio County, West Virginia, United States. It is part of the Wheeling metropolitan area. The population was 472 at the 2020 census.

== Geography ==
Clearview is located at 40°8′32″N 80°41′27″W (40.142204, -80.690849).

According to the United States Census Bureau, the village has a total area of 0.42 square miles (1.09 km^{2}), all land.

== Demographics ==
Historical population
Census	Pop.	Note	%±
1960	520		—
1970	512		−1.5%
1980	740		44.5%
1990	622		−15.9%
2000	590		−5.1%
2010	565		−4.2%
2020	472		−16.5%
U.S. Decennial Census

=== 2010 census ===
At the 2010 census there were 565 people, 221 households, and 164 families living in the village. The population density was 1,345.2 inhabitants per square mile (519.4/km^{2}). There were 226 housing units at an average density of 538.1 per square mile (207.8/km^{2}). The racial makeup of the village was 99.3% White, 0.4% African American, 0.2% Pacific Islander, and 0.2% from two or more races. Hispanic or Latino of any race were 0.4%.

Of the 221 households 30.8% had children under the age of 18 living with them, 66.1% were married couples living together, 5.4% had a female householder with no husband present, 2.7% had a male householder with no wife present, and 25.8% were non-families. 23.1% of households were one person and 12.2% were one person aged 65 or older. The average household size was 2.56 and the average family size was 3.01.

The median age in the village was 45.6 years. 22.7% of residents were under the age of 18; 5.7% were between the ages of 18 and 24; 20.3% were from 25 to 44; 37.3% were from 45 to 64; and 14% were 65 or older. The gender makeup of the village was 50.8% male and 49.2% female.

=== 2000 census ===
At the 2000 census there were 590 people, 223 households, and 179 families living in the village. The population density was 1,502.1 people per square mile (584.1/km^{2}). There were 231 housing units at an average density of 588.1 per square mile (228.7/km^{2}). The racial makeup of the village was 99.66% White and 0.34% Asian. Hispanic or Latino of any race were 0.17%.

Of the 223 households 33.2% had children under the age of 18 living with them, 72.6% were married couples living together, 7.2% had a female householder with no husband present, and 19.3% were non-families. 18.4% of households were one person and 11.7% were one person aged 65 or older. The average household size was 2.65 and the average family size was 2.99.

The age distribution was 23.9% under the age of 18, 4.9% from 18 to 24, 28.3% from 25 to 44, 26.1% from 45 to 64, and 16.8% 65 or older. The median age was 42 years. For every 100 females there were 89.1 males. For every 100 females age 18 and over, there were 84.8 males.

The median household income was $41,250 and the median family income was $45,000. Males had a median income of $32,250 versus $23,750 for females. The per capita income for the village was $19,404. About 6.3% of families and 8.3% of the population were below the poverty line, including 9.2% of those under age 18 and 4.3% of those age 65 or over.
