= Roneys Point, West Virginia =

Roneys Point
- Unincorporated community
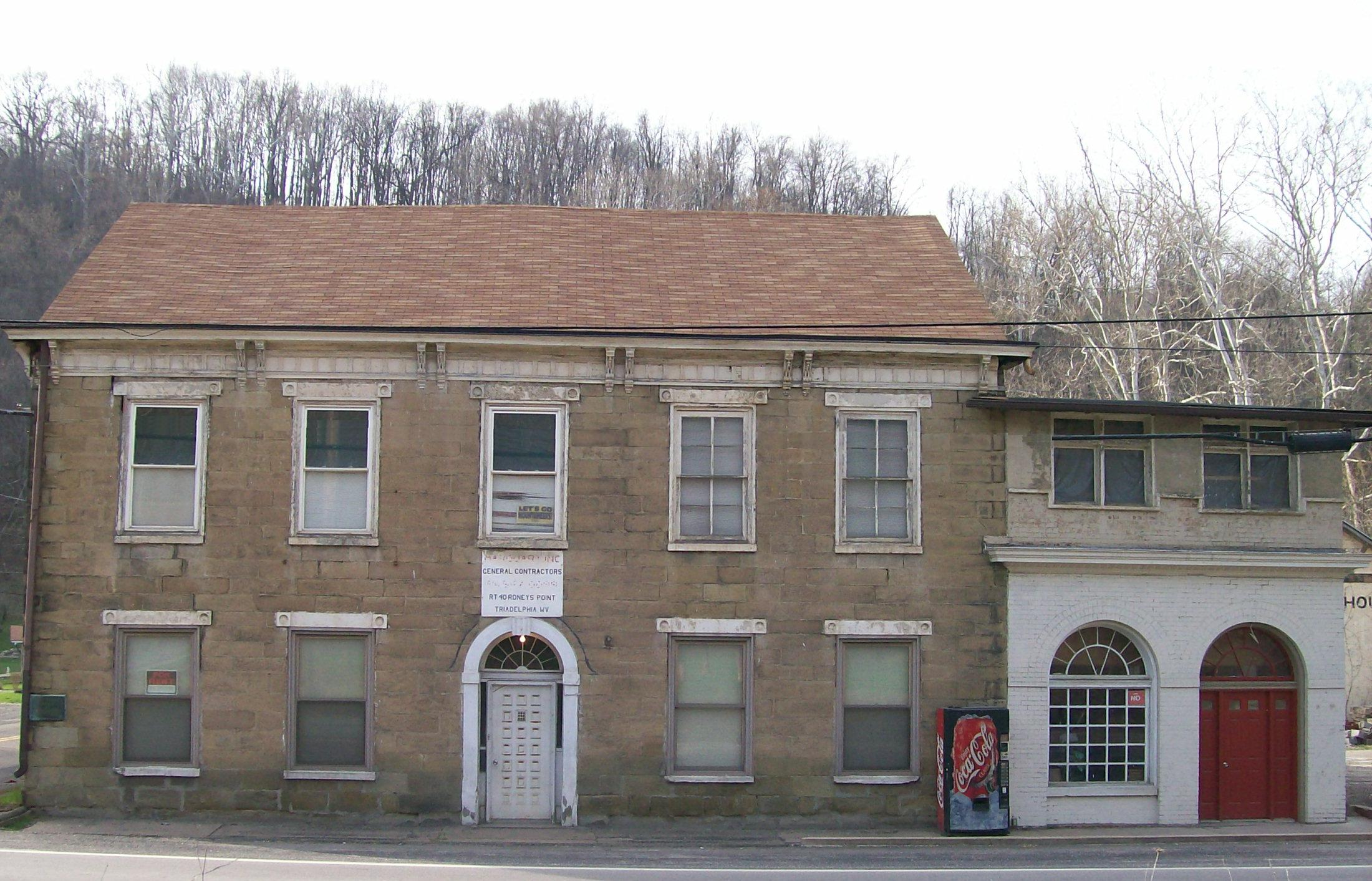
- Stone Tavern at Roney's Point, early nineteenth century

- Location within the state of West Virginia Roneys Point (the United States)
- Coordinates: 40°4′25″N 80°35′59″W
- Country: United States
- State: West Virginia
- County: Ohio
- Time zone: UTC-5 (Eastern (EST))
  - Summer (DST): UTC-4 (EDT)
- GNIS feature ID: 1560599

Roneys Point is an unincorporated community in Ohio County, West Virginia, United States. Roneys Point is located along Little Wheeling Creek on the National Road (U.S. Route 40) between Point Mills and Valley Camp. It is part of the Wheeling, West Virginia Metropolitan Statistical Area.

Roney's point most likely was named for an early settler with the surname Roney (first name unknown).
