= Northern panhandle of West Virginia =

Coordinates: 40°10′N 80°35′W

Northern panhandle
- Map of counties of the northern panhandle. Red denotes counties in the physical region, while light red denotes counties outside of the physical region that are considered part of it culturally.
- Country: United States
- State: West Virginia
- Largest city: Wheeling
- Other cities: List: In Region: Weirton; Moundsville; Follansbee; Chester

Population (2020 Census)
  - Total: 147,425 (All counties); 124,670 (Excluding Tyler and Wetzel Counties)
- Time zone: UTC−5 (EST)
  - Summer (DST): UTC−4 (EDT)

The northern panhandle is one of the two panhandles in the U.S. state of West Virginia (the other is the Eastern panhandle). It is a culturally and geographically distinct region of the state. It is the state's northernmost extension, bounded by Ohio and the Ohio River on the north and west and the state of Pennsylvania on the east. Its unusual configuration is the result of the Revolutionary-era claims of Virginia's former Yohogania County boundary lying along the Ohio River, conflicting with interpretations of the Colony of Pennsylvania's royal charter. The conflict was settled by compromise in the 1780s.

In 2013, its northernmost two counties were included in the Pittsburgh consolidated area by the U.S. Census.

== Geography ==
=== Composition ===
The following counties, listed from north to south, are universally accepted as being part of the northern panhandle:

- Hancock County
- Brooke County
- Ohio County
- Marshall County

Most West Virginians also include Wetzel County, and sometimes Tyler County, directly to the south of Marshall County, as a part of the northern panhandle, although they do not lie strictly within the northern extension. Prior to the 2020 redistricting, they formed the core of West Virginia's 1st congressional district.

=== Demographics ===
The region had a total combined population of 132,295, counting counties only physically on the panhandle, and 158,086 counting Wetzel and Tyler counties as of the 2010 census. In the 2020 census, the populations were 124,670 and 147,425, respectively. This constitutes a drop of 5.76% and 7.23%, keeping with the overall population trends of the Rust Belt.

The northern counties of the northern panhandle comprise part of the Weirton–Steubenville, WV–OH Metropolitan Statistical Area, as well as the western regions of Greater Pittsburgh. The southern counties are part of the Wheeling, WV–OH Metropolitan Area.

== Economy ==
In the late 19th century, the northern panhandle developed as an industrial area, especially in the manufacturing of steel and glass products. It still largely retains its industrial character, although many of its factories have closed down or fallen on hard times like others in the Rust Belt. The region also contains the panhandle coalfield.

Banks in these counties are serviced by the Federal Reserve Bank of Cleveland, while the rest of West Virginia is in the Federal Reserve Bank of Richmond.

== Education ==
The region houses three four-year colleges: the public West Liberty University and the private Bethany College and Wheeling University. All five counties listed in this article, plus Tyler County, are located within the service area of West Virginia Northern Community College.

== See also ==
- Yohogania County, Virginia
