= Twilight, West Virginia =

- Census-designated place
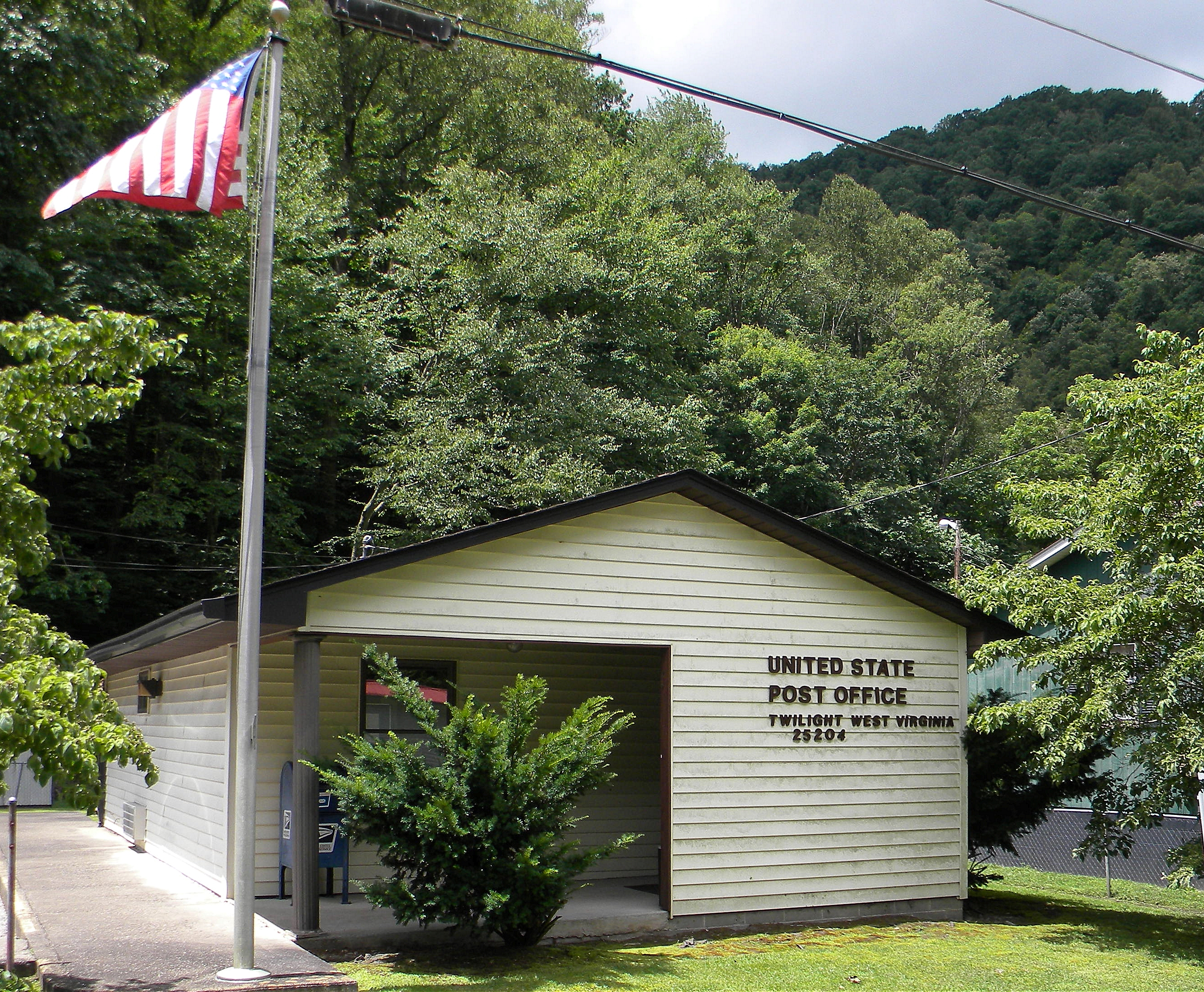
- Twilight West Virginia Post Office

- Location within West Virginia and the United States Twilight (the United States)
- Coordinates: 37°55′38″N 81°37′24″W
- Country: United States
- State: West Virginia
- County: Boone

Area
  - Total: 0.502 sq mi (1.30 km^{2})
  - Land: 0.501 sq mi (1.30 km^{2})
  - Water: 0.001 sq mi (0.0026 km^{2})

Population (2020)
  - Total: 74
  - Density: 150/sq mi (57/km^{2})
- Time zone: UTC-5 (Eastern (EST))
  - Summer (DST): UTC-4 (EDT)
- ZIP codes: 25204
- GNIS feature ID: 1548396

Twilight is a census-designated place (CDP) in Boone County, West Virginia, United States. As of the 2020 census, its population was 74 (down from 90 at the 2010 census). Twilight is approximately 20 miles from Madison. Twilight is accessible from Boone County Route 26, which is located right off West Virginia Route 85 at the Van Bridge split.

The name Twilight was chosen by the United States Postal Service in 1949 out of several names submitted. The ZIP code for Twilight is 25204.
