= Clinton, Ohio County, West Virginia =

Unincorporated community in West Virginia, United States

Clinton
- Unincorporated community
- Location within the state of West Virginia Clinton (the United States)
- Coordinates: 40°7′26″N 80°37′34″W
- Country: United States
- State: West Virginia
- County: Ohio
- Time zone: UTC-5 (Eastern (EST))
  - Summer (DST): UTC-4 (EDT)

Clinton is an unincorporated community in Ohio County, West Virginia, United States. It lies at an elevation of 968 feet (295 m).

Clinton bears the name of a pioneer settler.
