= Triadelphia, West Virginia =

Town in West Virginia, US

- Town
- Location of Triadelphia in Ohio County, West Virginia.
- Coordinates: 40°3′3″N 80°37′37″W
- Country: United States
- State: West Virginia
- County: Ohio
- Chartered: 1829

Area
  - Total: 0.68 sq mi (1.75 km^{2})
  - Land: 0.67 sq mi (1.74 km^{2})
  - Water: 0 sq mi (0.00 km^{2})
- Elevation: 741 ft (226 m)

Population (2020)
  - Total: 669
  - Estimate (2021): 659
  - Density: 1,132.6/sq mi (437.29/km^{2})
- Time zone: UTC-5 (Eastern (EST))
  - Summer (DST): UTC-4 (EDT)
- ZIP code: 26059
- Area code: 304
- FIPS code: 54-80932
- GNIS feature ID: 1555822
- Website: triadelphia.wv.gov

Triadelphia is a town in Ohio County, West Virginia, United States. It is part of the Wheeling Metropolitan Area. The population was 669 at the 2020 census.

== History ==
Triadelphia was originally chartered in 1829. The name Triadelphia was adopted from the Greek words meaning three brothers, and most likely was named in honor of the three sons of the original owner of the town site.

It is home to the Highlands, the largest retail complex in the Northern Panhandle of West Virginia.

Located near Triadelphia is the David Stewart Farm, listed on the National Register of Historic Places in 1979.

== Geography ==
Triadelphia is located at 40°3′3″N 80°37′37″W (40.050705, -80.627015), along Little Wheeling Creek and Middle Wheeling Creek, which are tributaries of Wheeling Creek.

According to the United States Census Bureau, the town has a total area of 0.67 square miles (1.74 km^{2}), all land.

== Demographics ==
Historical population
Census	Pop.	Note	%±
1850	242		—
1860	258		6.6%
1870	239		−7.4%
1880	313		31.0%
1890	515		64.5%
1900	287		−44.3%
1910	261		−9.1%
1920	299		14.6%
1930	302		1.0%
1940	359		18.9%
1950	741		106.4%
1960	600		−19.0%
1970	547		−8.8%
1980	1,461		167.1%
1990	835		−42.8%
2000	817		−2.2%
2010	811		−0.7%
2020	669		−17.5%
2021 (est.)	659	▼	−1.5%
U.S. Decennial Census

=== 2010 census ===
As of the census of 2010, there were 811 people, 373 households, and 221 families living in the town. The population density was 1,210.4 inhabitants per square mile (467.3/km^{2}). There were 402 housing units at an average density of 600.0 per square mile (231.7/km^{2}). The racial makeup of the town was 95.1% White, 3.1% African American, 0.1% Asian, 0.1% from other races, and 1.6% from two or more races. Hispanic or Latino of any race were 1.0% of the population.

There were 373 households, of which 26.0% had children under the age of 18 living with them, 36.5% were married couples living together, 15.5% had a female householder with no husband present, 7.2% had a male householder with no wife present, and 40.8% were non-families. 34.0% of all households were made up of individuals, and 8.8% had someone living alone who was 65 years of age or older. The average household size was 2.17 and the average family size was 2.71.

The median age in the town was 40 years. 22.2% of residents were under the age of 18; 6.8% were between the ages of 18 and 24; 26.7% were from 25 to 44; 29.1% were from 45 to 64; and 15.3% were 65 years of age or older. The gender makeup of the town was 48.8% male and 51.2% female.

=== 2000 census ===
As of the census of 2000, there were 817 people, 370 households, and 223 families living in the town. The population density was 1,187.2 inhabitants per square mile (457.2/km^{2}). There were 406 housing units at an average density of 590.0 per square mile (227.2/km^{2}). The racial makeup of the town was 97.31% White, 1.59% African American, 0.12% Native American, and 0.98% from two or more races. Hispanic or Latino of any race were 0.73% of the population. 25.9% were of German, 13.4% Irish, 11.2% Italian, 9.3% Polish, 8.9% American and 7.0% English ancestry according to Census 2000.

There were 370 households, out of which 24.6% had children under the age of 18 living with them, 44.9% were married couples living together, 11.1% had a female householder with no husband present, and 39.7% were non-families. 35.1% of all households were made up of individuals, and 14.3% had someone living alone who was 65 years of age or older. The average household size was 2.21 and the average family size was 2.83.

In the town, the population was spread out, with 20.8% under the age of 18, 9.8% from 18 to 24, 29.7% from 25 to 44, 25.9% from 45 to 64, and 13.7% who were 65 years of age or older. The median age was 39 years. For every 100 females, there were 97.8 males. For every 100 females age 18 and over, there were 89.2 males.

The median income for a household in the town was $26,169, and the median income for a family was $36,136. Males had a median income of $25,441 versus $18,958 for females. The per capita income for the town was $14,267. About 15.8% of families and 15.8% of the population were below the poverty line, including 22.4% of those under age 18 and 6.0% of those age 65 or over.

== Transportation and Infrastructure ==
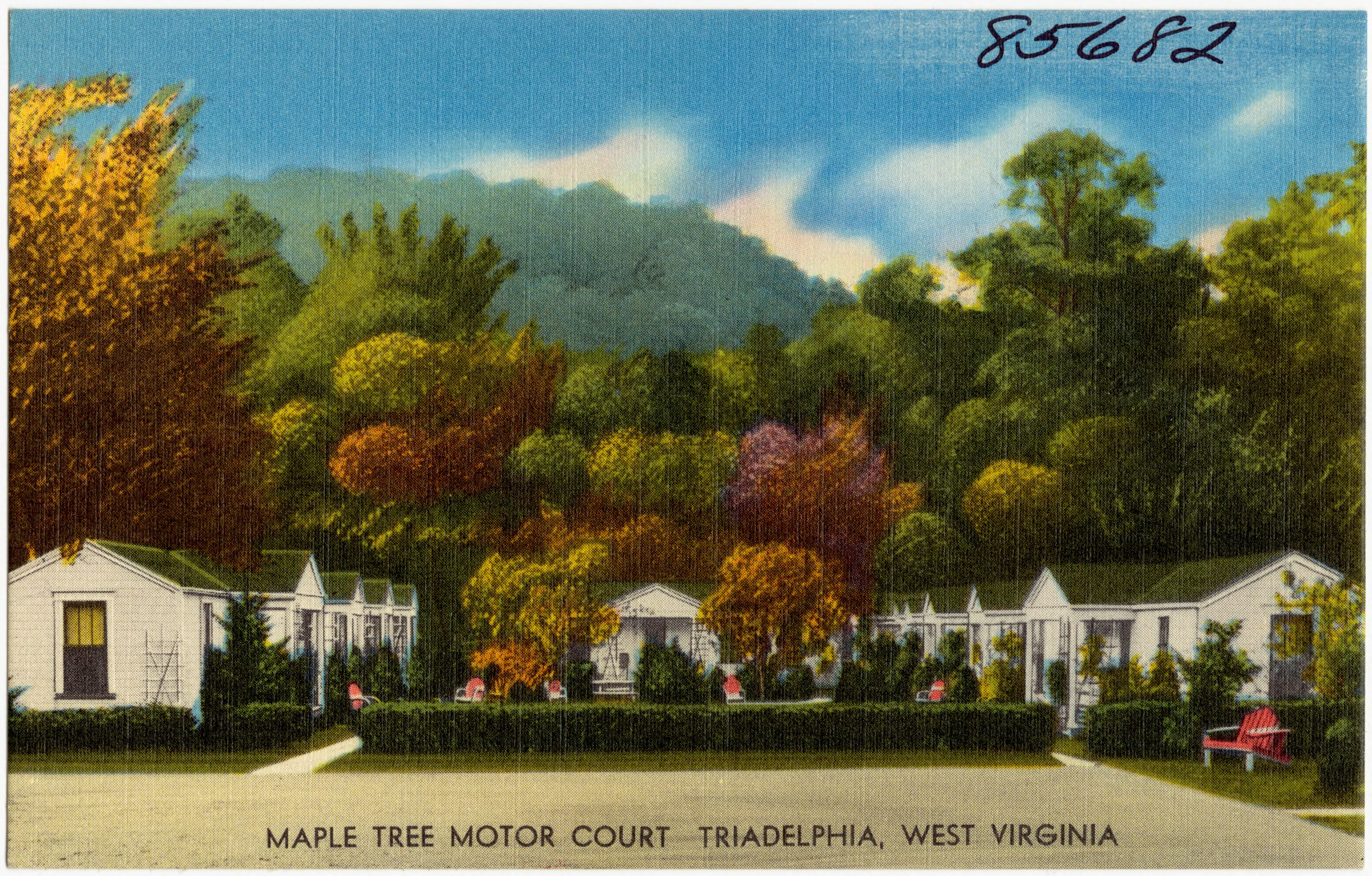
Maple Tree Motor Court

Many parts of Triadelphia are accessible through Interstate 70 or the slightly-farther Interstate 470. U.S. Route 40 (US 40) runs through the northeastern suburbs of Wheeling, Triadelphia and Valley Grove. A majority of the route, including the portion in Triadelphia, still follows the route of the old National Road, which antedates the U.S. Highway System.

No passenger rail travel exists today within Triadelphia.

Air travel is restricted to Pittsburgh International Airport as the closest and most accessible place for commercial airline service, while Wheeling Ohio County Airport is the primary general aviation airport for Triadelphia.

Health care (11.7%), Accommodation & food services (9.2%), Construction (8.9%), Administrative & support & waste management services (5.7%), Drugs, sundries, chemical & allied products merchant wholesalers (5.4%), Social assistance (4.9%), and Educational services (4.9%) are the most common industries in Triadelphia, WV ( percent ).
