= Point Mills, West Virginia =

Point Mills
- Unincorporated community
- Location within the state of West Virginia Point Mills (the United States)
- Coordinates: 40°4′57″N 80°34′51″W
- Country: United States
- State: West Virginia
- County: Ohio
- Time zone: UTC-5 (Eastern (EST))
  - Summer (DST): UTC-4 (EDT)
- GNIS feature ID: 1545095

Point Mills is an unincorporated community in Ohio County, West Virginia, United States. Point Mills lies along the National Road (U.S. Route 40) and is incorporated into the Village of Valley Grove. It is part of the Wheeling, West Virginia Metropolitan Statistical Area.
