= Valley Camp, West Virginia =

- Unincorporated community
- Location within West Virginia Location within the United States
- Coordinates: 40°03′52″N 80°36′27″W
- Country: United States
- State: West Virginia
- County: Ohio
- Elevation: 794 ft (242 m)
- Time zone: UTC-5 (Eastern (EST))
  - Summer (DST): UTC-4 (EDT)
- Area codes: 304 & 681
- GNIS feature ID: 1555867

Valley Camp is an unincorporated community in Ohio County, West Virginia, United States. Valley Camp is located along U.S. Route 40, 1.4 miles (2.3 km) northeast of Triadelphia.
