= Short Creek (Ohio River tributary) =

Stream in West Virginia, USA

Short Creek Tributary to Ohio River
- Location of Short Creek mouth Short Creek (Ohio River tributary) (the United States)

Location
- Country: United States
- State: West Virginia
- County: Ohio; Brooke; Marshall
- City: Short Creek

Physical characteristics
- Source: Longs Run divide
  - location: about 2 miles northeast of Clinton, West Virginia
  - coordinates: 40°08′12″N 080°35′06″W
  - elevation: 1,180 ft (360 m)
- Mouth: Ohio River
  - location: Short Creek, West Virginia
  - coordinates: 40°10′59″N 080°40′37″W
  - elevation: 644 ft (196 m)
- Length: 10.07 mi (16.21 km)
- Basin size: 24.32 square miles (63.0 km^{2})
- Discharge
  - location: Ohio River
  - average: 92.46 cu ft/s (2.618 m^{3}/s) at mouth with Ohio River

Basin features
- Progression: Ohio River → Mississippi River → Gulf of Mexico
- River system: Ohio River
- Tributaries
  - left: Souttell Run
  - right: North Fork Short Creek; Waddles Run; Girty Run
- Bridges: WV 37 (x3), Old Trail Farm, WV 88, WV 7, Freedom Heights, WV 1 (x3), Wainwrigt Street (x2), WV 1, WV 2

Short Creek is a stream in the U.S. state of West Virginia. It is a tributary of the Ohio River.

Short Creek was so named on account of its relatively short watercourse.

== See also ==
- List of rivers of West Virginia
