= Windsor Heights, West Virginia =

- Village
- Seal

- Location of Windsor Heights in Brooke County, West Virginia.
- Coordinates: 40°11′30″N 80°39′56″W
- Country: United States
- State: West Virginia
- County: Brooke
- Incorporated: 1989

Area
  - Total: 0.14 sq mi (0.37 km^{2})
  - Land: 0.14 sq mi (0.37 km^{2})
  - Water: 0 sq mi (0.00 km^{2})
- Elevation: 1,004 ft (306 m)

Population (2020)
  - Total: 361
  - Density: 2,651.9/sq mi (1,023.92/km^{2})
- Time zone: UTC-5 (Eastern (EST))
  - Summer (DST): UTC-4 (EDT)
- ZIP code: 26075
- Area code: 304
- FIPS code: 54-87892
- GNIS feature ID: 1560604

Windsor Heights is a village in Brooke County, West Virginia, United States. It is part of the Weirton-Steubenville metropolitan area. The population was 361 at the 2020 census. Grace Davis was the mayor as of June 2017. Windsor Heights was incorporated in 1989.

== Geography ==
Windsor Heights is located at 40°11′30″N 80°39′56″W (40.191658, -80.665594).

According to the United States Census Bureau, the village has a total area of 0.14 square miles (0.36 km^{2}), all land.

== Demographics ==
Historical population
Census	Pop.	Note	%±
2000	431		—
2010	423		−1.9%
2020	361		−14.7%
U.S. Decennial Census

=== 2010 census ===
As of the census of 2010, there were 423 people, 170 households, and 121 families living in the village. The population density was 3,021.4 inhabitants per square mile (1,166.6/km^{2}). There were 185 housing units at an average density of 1,321.4 per square mile (510.2/km^{2}). The racial makeup of the village was 99.5% White and 0.5% African American.

There were 170 households, of which 32.9% had children under the age of 18 living with them, 54.7% were married couples living together, 10.6% had a female householder with no husband present, 5.9% had a male householder with no wife present, and 28.8% were non-families. 25.3% of all households were made up of individuals, and 14.7% had someone living alone who was 65 years of age or older. The average household size was 2.48 and the average family size was 2.94.

The median age in the village was 40.6 years. 22.2% of residents were under the age of 18; 5.3% were between the ages of 18 and 24; 26.7% were from 25 to 44; 30.5% were from 45 to 64; and 15.4% were 65 years of age or older. The gender makeup of the village was 50.4% male and 49.6% female.

=== 2000 census ===
As of the census of 2000, there were 431 people, 180 households, and 124 families living in the village. The population density was 3,053.2 people per square mile (1,188.6/km^{2}). There were 197 housing units at an average density of 1,395.6 per square mile (543.3/km^{2}). The racial makeup of the village was 99.07% White, 0.46% Native American, and 0.46% from two or more races.

There were 180 households, out of which 26.1% had children under the age of 18 living with them, 55.0% were married couples living together, 9.4% had a female householder with no husband present, and 31.1% were non-families. 26.7% of all households were made up of individuals, and 17.2% had someone living alone who was 65 years of age or older. The average household size was 2.39 and the average family size was 2.91.

The age distribution is 20.9% under the age of 18, 7.9% from 18 to 24, 26.7% from 25 to 44, 25.5% from 45 to 64, and 19.0% who were 65 years of age or older. The median age was 40 years. For every 100 females, there were 93.3 males. For every 100 females age 18 and over, there were 98.3 males.

The median income for a household in the village was $28,523, and the median income for a family was $37,794. Males had a median income of $30,833 versus $20,000 for females. The per capita income for the village was $17,315. About 5.6% of families and 8.4% of the population were below the poverty line, including 10.5% of those under age 18 and 3.3% of those age 65 or over.

== See also ==
- List of cities and towns along the Ohio River
