= Little Wheeling Creek =

Stream in West Virginia, United States

Little Wheeling Creek Tributary to Wheeling Creek
- Location of Little Wheeling Creek mouth Little Wheeling Creek (the United States)

Location
- Country: United States
- State: West Virginia
- County: Ohio
- City: Wheeling

Physical characteristics
- Source: Dutch Fork divide
  - location: about 0.25 miles northwest of West Alexander, Pennsylvania
  - coordinates: 40°06′48″N 080°31′10″W
  - elevation: 1,190 ft (360 m)
- Mouth: Wheeling Creek
  - location: Wheeling, West Virginia
  - coordinates: 40°02′36″N 080°39′33″W
  - elevation: 669 ft (204 m)
- Length: 5.37 mi (8.64 km)
- Basin size: 62.2 square miles (161 km^{2})
- Discharge
  - location: Wheeling Creek
  - average: 73.72 cu ft/s (2.088 m^{3}/s) at mouth with Wheeling Creek

Basin features
- Progression: Wheeling Creek → Ohio River → Mississippi River → Gulf of Mexico
- River system: Ohio River
- Tributaries
  - left: Point Run; Middle Wheeling Creek
  - right: McGraw Run; Battle Run; Dixon Run; Roneys Point Run; Gashell Run; McCoy Run; Peters Run
- Bridges: US 40, West Main Street, Fls Drive, US 40 (x3), Cove Creek Road, Cooper Road, US 40 (x2), Battle Run Road, Dixon Run Road, US 40 (x2), Point Run Road, Blayney Avenue, US 40 (x3), Springer Addition, Middle Creek Road, US 40, Elm Grove Crossing Mall, I-70, National Road

Little Wheeling Creek is a 5.37 mi (8.64 km) long 4th order tributary to Wheeling Creek in Ohio County, West Virginia.

== Variant names ==
According to the Geographic Names Information System, it has also been known historically as:

- Middle Wheeling Creek

== Course ==
Little Wheeling Creek rises about 0.25 miles northwest of West Alexander, Pennsylvania, in Washington County and then flows southwest into Ohio County, West Virginia to Wheeling Creek at Wheeling.

== Watershed ==
Little Wheeling Creek drains 62.2 square miles (161 km^{2}) of area, receives about 41.0 in/year of precipitation, has a wetness index of 293.17, and is about 63% forested.

== See also ==
- List of rivers of Pennsylvania
- List of rivers of West Virginia
