= Wheeling Creek (West Virginia) =

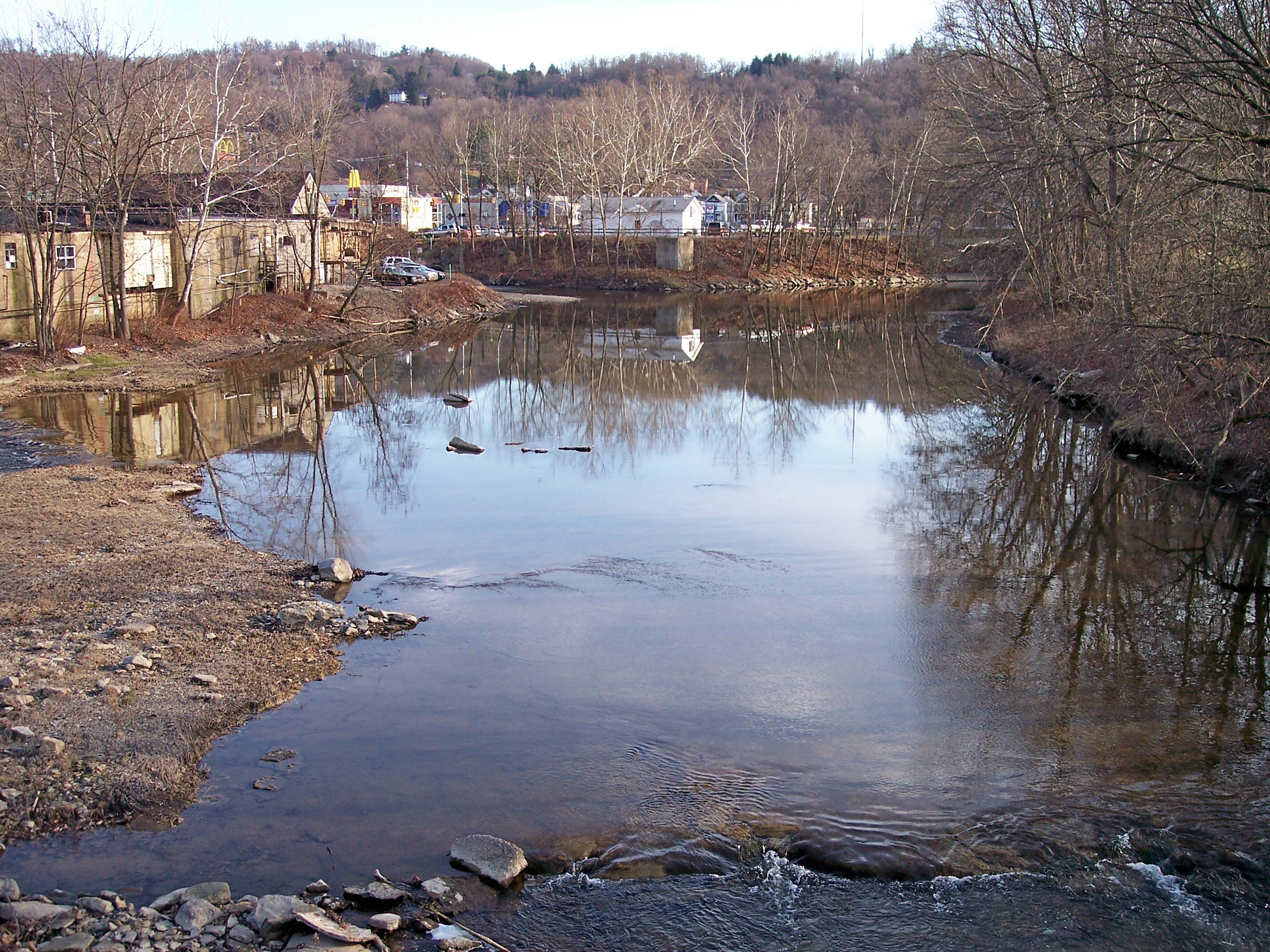
- Wheeling Creek in Wheeling in 2006

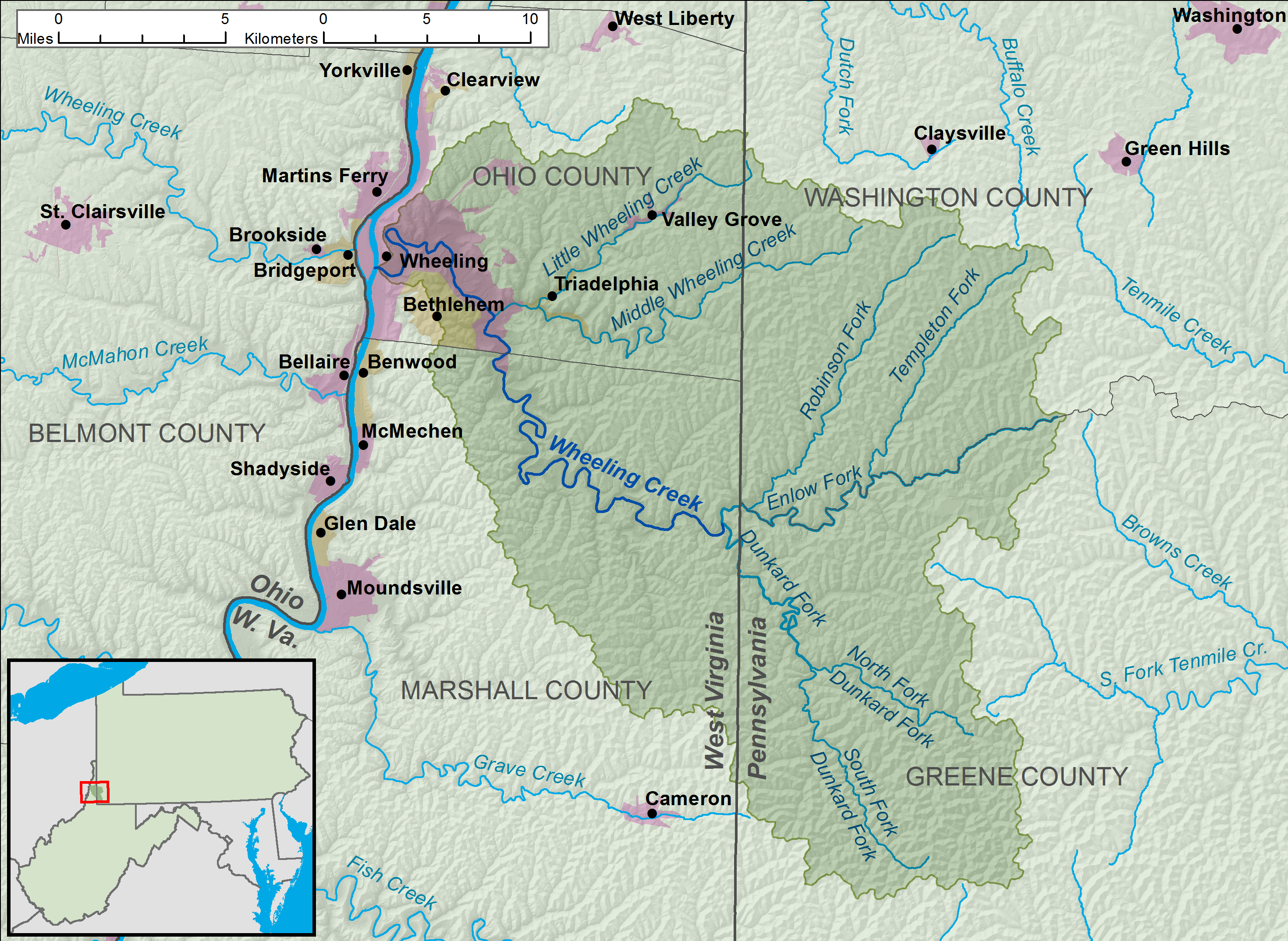
- A map of Wheeling Creek and its watershed

Location
- Country: United States
- State: West Virginia
- Counties: Marshall, Ohio

Physical characteristics
- Source: Enlow Fork
  - location: boundary of Greene and Washington Counties, Pennsylvania
  - coordinates: 40°00′08″N 80°20′27″W
  - elevation: 1,339 ft (408 m)
- 2nd source: Dunkard Fork
  - location: Confluence of North Fork and South Fork, Richhill Township, Greene County, Pennsylvania
  - coordinates: 39°53′33″N 80°28′41″W
  - elevation: 927 ft (283 m)
- Source confluence
  - location: northeastern Marshall County near Majorsville, West Virginia
  - coordinates: 39°57′15″N 80°31′43″W
  - elevation: 829 ft (253 m)
- Mouth: Ohio River
  - location: Wheeling, West Virginia
  - coordinates: 40°03′50″N 80°43′30″W
  - elevation: 630 ft (190 m)
- Length: 25 mi (40 km)
- Basin size: 300 mi^{2} (780 km^{2})approx.
- Discharge
  - location: mouth
  - average: 373.5 cu ft/s (10.58 m^{3}/s) (estimate)

Basin features
- Progression: Ohio River → Mississippi River → Gulf of Mexico
- Tributaries
  - left: Dunkard Fork; Wolf Run; Stull Run; Burch Run; Bald Eagle Hollow; Hollidays Run; Seabright Hollow; Jakes Run
  - right: Enlow Fork; Turkey Run; Bruce Run; Cricket Hollow; Grandstaff Run; Britt Run; Little Wheeling Creek; Carter Run; Long Run

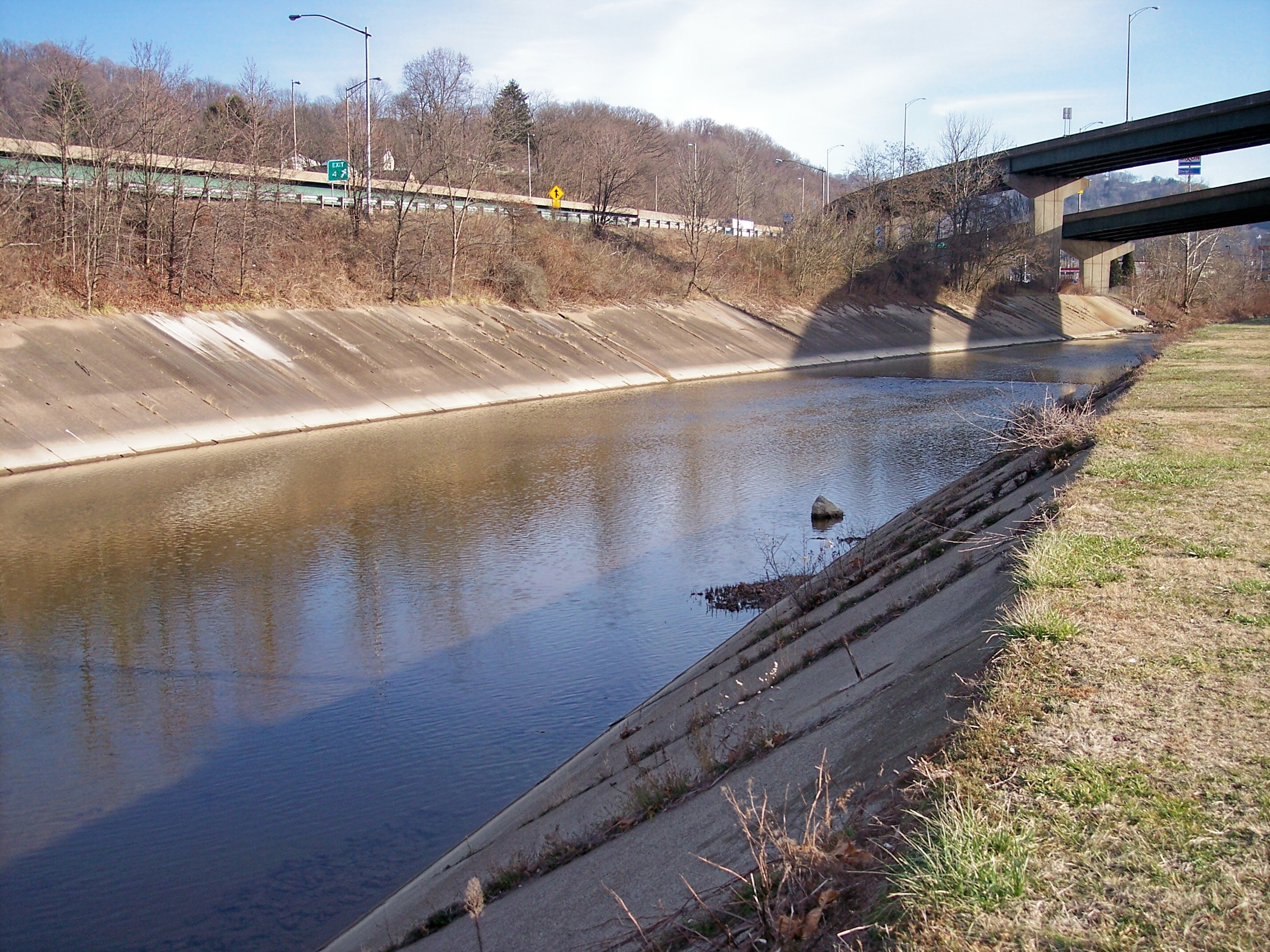
Wheeling Creek as viewed at the junction of Interstates 70 and 470 in Wheeling in 2006

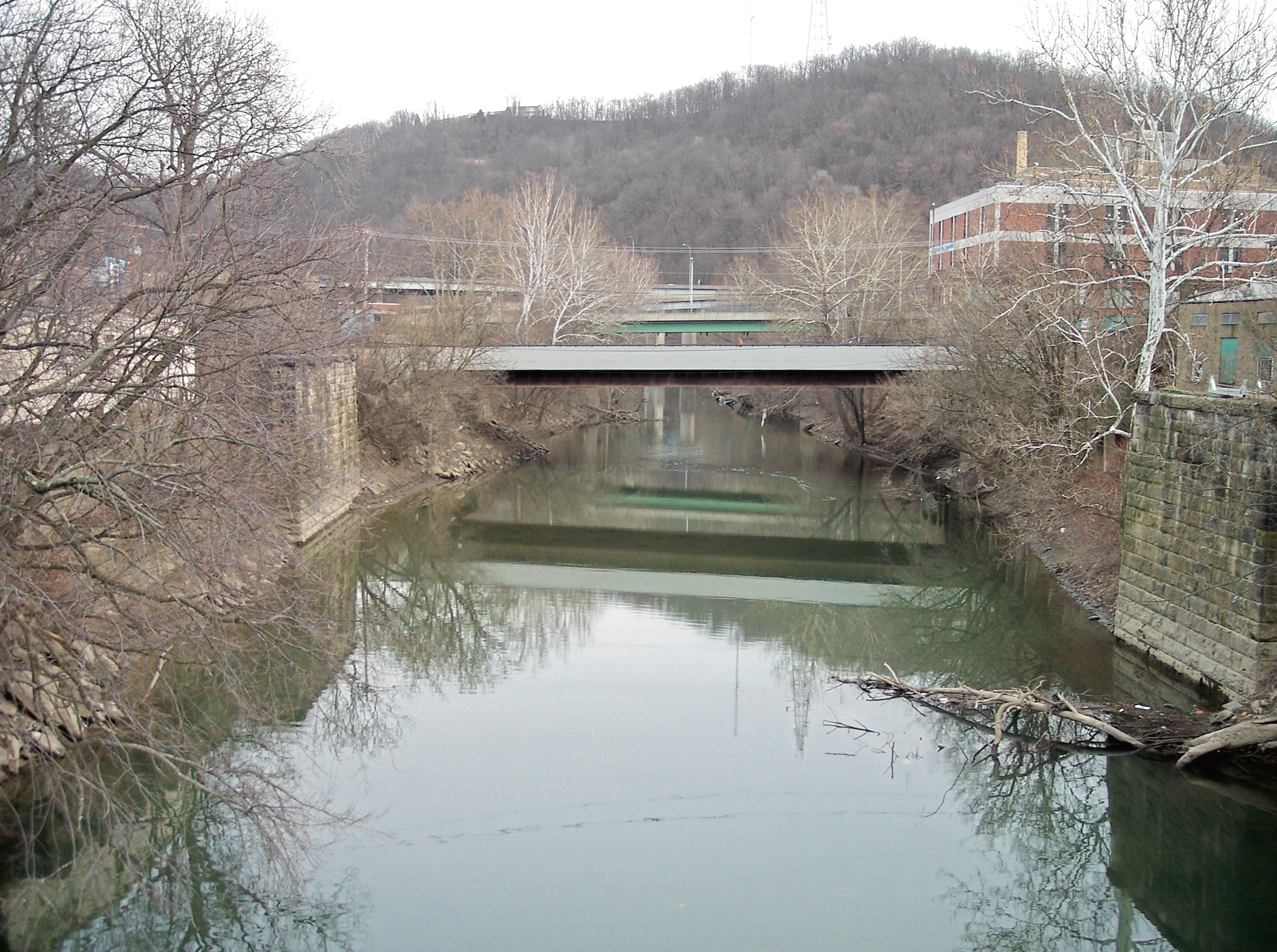
Wheeling Creek as viewed upstream from Main Street in downtown Wheeling in 2006

Wheeling Creek is a tributary of the Ohio River, 25 miles (40 km) long, in the northern panhandle of West Virginia, with a watershed extending into southwestern Pennsylvania. Via the Ohio River, it is part of the watershed of the Mississippi River, draining an area of approximately 300 square miles (780 km^{2}) on the unglaciated portion of the Allegheny Plateau. It flows into the Ohio River in downtown Wheeling, just downstream of Ohio's Wheeling Creek on the opposite bank. A variant name is Big Wheeling Creek. According to the French explorer Pierre Joseph Céloron de Blainville, the native name of the stream is the Kanououara River, as was inscribed on the lead plate buried at the mouth by the Ohio River in 1749.

== Geography ==
Wheeling Creek is formed in northeastern Marshall County, West Virginia, by the confluence of streams known as the Enlow Fork and the Dunkard Fork:

- Enlow Fork, also known historically as "Enslow Fork," rises in Pennsylvania on the boundary of Greene and Washington Counties, and flows west-southwestwardly along that boundary into Marshall County. Enlow Fork defines the northern boundaries of Morris, Gray, and Richhill Townships in Greene County; and the southern boundaries of Morris, East Finley, and West Finley townships in Washington County.
- Dunkard Fork, also known historically as "Crow Creek," is formed in Pennsylvania by the confluence of the North Fork Dunkard Fork and the South Fork Dunkard Fork in Richhill Township in Greene County, and flows northwestwardly into Marshall County. Its north and south forks each flow northwestwardly into Richhill Township; the North Fork rises in Jackson Township and flows through Ryerson Station State Park, where it is dammed to form a lake; and the South Fork rises in Aleppo Township.

From the confluence of the Dunkard and Enlow forks, Wheeling Creek flows northwestwardly into the city of Wheeling in Ohio County. In the Elm Grove neighborhood of Wheeling, it collects Little Wheeling Creek, which rises in Ohio County just west of the Pennsylvania state line and flows southwestwardly through the communities of Valley Grove and Triadelphia. In Triadelphia, Little Wheeling Creek collects Middle Wheeling Creek, which rises in West Finley Township in Greene County, Pennsylvania, and flows generally westwardly into southeastern Ohio County.

The National Road (U.S. Route 40) parallels Little Wheeling Creek through eastern Ohio County, and follows Wheeling Creek for part of its route through the city of Wheeling; the creek is also paralleled for five miles (8.0 km) in Wheeling by a rail trail as part of the Wheeling Heritage Trail network.

According to the West Virginia Department of Environmental Protection, of the 141 square miles (370 km^{2}) drained by Wheeling Creek in West Virginia, approximately 67% is forested; approximately 27% is used for agriculture; and approximately 5% is urban.

== Discharge ==
At its mouth, the estimated mean annual flow volume of Wheeling Creek is 373.5 cubic feet per second (10.58 m^{3}/s). The United States Geological Survey operates a stream gauge on the creek in the Elm Grove neighborhood of Wheeling, downstream of the mouth of Little Wheeling Creek and 7.8 miles (12.6 km) upstream of the creek's mouth. Between 1941 and 2005, the annual mean flow of the creek at the gauge was 343 cubic feet per second (9.7 m^{3}/s). The creek's highest flow during the period was estimated at 22,300 cu ft/s (630 m^{3}/s) on September 17, 2004. The lowest recorded flow was 0.1 cu ft/s (0.0028 m^{3}/s) on October 7, 1963, and on two days in September 1964.

== Fishing ==
Wheeling Creek is a popular fishing destination to those close to it. There are many entry points located alongside the Wheeling Heritage Trail System. There are a variety of fish species including muskellunge, smallmouth bass, sunfish, hognose suckers, various species of catfish, and bluegill. Wheeling Creek is also regularly stocked with rainbow trout and brown trout.

== See also ==
- List of tributaries of Wheeling Creek
- Elm Grove Stone Arch Bridge
- Fisher site — archeological site along Enlow Fork.
- List of West Virginia rivers
