= Ohio County, West Virginia =

County in West Virginia, United States

- County
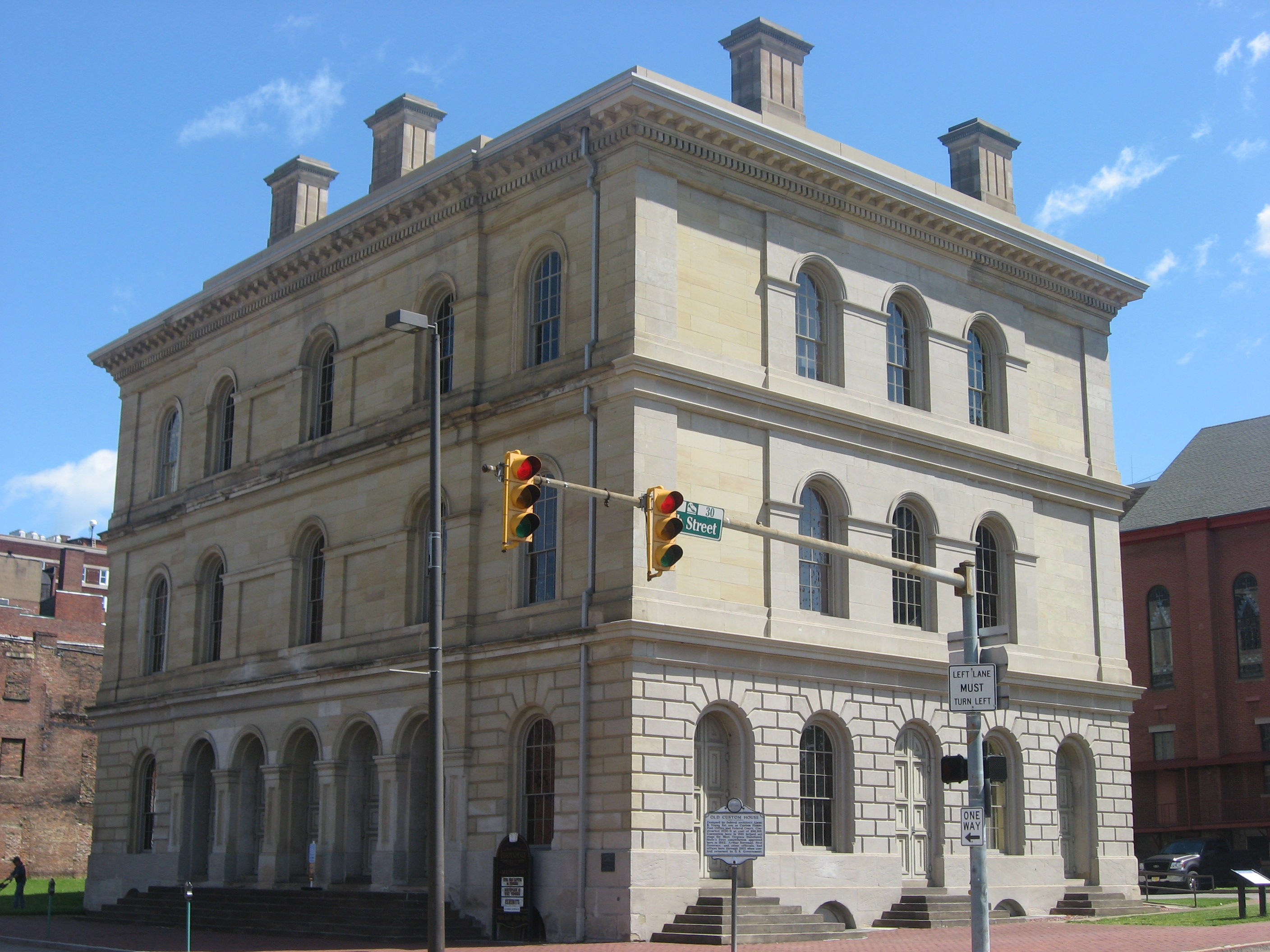
- West Virginia Independence Hall

- Seal

- Location within the U.S. state of West Virginia
- Coordinates: 40°06′N 80°37′W
- Country: United States
- State: West Virginia
- Founded: October 7, 1776
- Named for: Ohio River
- Seat: Wheeling
- Largest city: Wheeling

Area
  - Total: 109 sq mi (280 km^{2})
  - Land: 106 sq mi (270 km^{2})
  - Water: 3.2 sq mi (8.3 km^{2}) 2.9%

Population (2020)
  - Total: 42,425
  - Estimate (2025): 40,496 ▼
  - Density: 400/sq mi (155/km^{2})
- Time zone: UTC−5 (Eastern)
  - Summer (DST): UTC−4 (EDT)
- Congressional district: 2nd
- Website: www.ohiocountywv.gov

Ohio County is a county located in the Northern Panhandle of the U.S. state of West Virginia, and forms part of the Wheeling metropolitan area. As of the 2020 census, the population was 42,425. Its county seat is Wheeling. The county was formed in 1776 from the District of West Augusta, Virginia. It was named for the Ohio River, which forms its western boundary with the state of Ohio. West Liberty (formerly Black's Cabin) was designated as the county seat in 1777, serving to 1797.

== Geography ==
According to the United States Census Bureau, the county has a total area of 109 square miles (280 km^{2}), of which 106 square miles (270 km^{2}) is land and 3.2 square miles (8.3 km^{2}) (2.9%) is water. It is the third-smallest county in West Virginia by area. The highest point of elevation in Ohio County is approximately 1,420 ft (430 m) and located about 1-mile (1.6 km) southwest of West Alexander, Pennsylvania. The county is drained by Wheeling and other small creeks.

When Ohio County was formed in 1776, its area was much larger totaling 1,432 sq mi (3,710 km^{2}) and included portions of what is now Washington and Greene counties in Pennsylvania. The formation of the Mason–Dixon line and resolution of border disputes between Pennsylvania and Virginia began the first in a long series of reductions in the county's size.

In 1863, West Virginia's counties were divided into civil townships, with the intention of encouraging local government. This proved impractical in the heavily rural state, and in 1872 the townships were converted into magisterial districts. Ohio County was divided into five districts: Center, (Note: Spelled "Centre" before 1890.) Clay, Liberty, Madison, Richland, Ritchie, Triadelphia, Union, Washington, and Webster. Centre, Clay, Madison, Union, and Webster Districts all lay within the city of Wheeling, as did part of Washington District.

By 1880, part of Ritchie District had also been subsumed by Wheeling. In the 1970s, the ten historic magisterial districts were consolidated into five new districts: Liberty Triadelphia; Madison, Union Clay, Washington District; Titchie Webster Center District, and Triadelphia. These were further consolidated in the 1980s to form District 1, District 2, and District 3.

=== Major highways ===
- I-70
- I-470
- US 40
- US 250
- WV 2
- WV 88

=== Adjacent counties ===
- Brooke County (north)
- Washington County, Pennsylvania (east)
- Marshall County (south)
- Belmont County, Ohio (west)
- Jefferson County, Ohio (northwest)

Ohio County is one of four counties in the United States to border a state with which it shares the same name (the other three counties are Nevada County, California; Texas County, Oklahoma; and Delaware County, Pennsylvania).

=== National protected area ===
- Ohio River Islands National Wildlife Refuge (part)

== Demographics ==
Historical population
Census	Pop.	Note	%±
1790	5,212		—
1800	4,740		−9.1%
1810	9,182		93.7%
1820	9,182		0.0%
1830	15,584		69.7%
1840	13,357		−14.3%
1850	18,006		34.8%
1860	22,422		24.5%
1870	28,831		28.6%
1880	37,457		29.9%
1890	41,557		10.9%
1900	48,024		15.6%
1910	57,572		19.9%
1920	62,892		9.2%
1930	72,077		14.6%
1940	73,115		1.4%
1950	71,672		−2.0%
1960	68,437		−4.5%
1970	64,197		−6.2%
1980	61,389		−4.4%
1990	50,871		−17.1%
2000	47,427		−6.8%
2010	44,443		−6.3%
2020	42,425		−4.5%
2025 (est.)	40,496	▼	−4.5%
U.S. Decennial Census; 1790–1960 1900–1990; 1990–2000 2010–2020

=== 2020 census ===
As of the 2020 census, there were 42,425 people and 18,335 households residing in the county. Of the residents, 19.1% were under the age of 18 and 21.8% were 65 years of age or older; the median age was 43.2 years. For every 100 females there were 94.6 males, and for every 100 females age 18 and over there were 91.6 males.

The racial makeup of the county was 89.0% White, 3.9% Black or African American, 0.2% American Indian and Alaska Native, 0.9% Asian, 0.7% from some other race, and 5.2% from two or more races. Hispanic or Latino residents of any race comprised 1.5% of the population.

Of the 18,335 households, 24.3% had children under the age of 18 living with them, 41.6% were married couples living together, 30.5% had a female householder with no spouse or partner present, and 20.8% had a male householder with no spouse present. About 36.2% of all households were made up of individuals and 16.5% had someone living alone who was 65 years of age or older. The average household and family size was 2.86.

The median income for a household was $57,867 and the poverty rate was 15.7%.

There were 21,170 housing units, of which 13.4% were vacant. Among occupied housing units, 65.0% were owner-occupied and 35.0% were renter-occupied. The homeowner vacancy rate was 2.3% and the rental vacancy rate was 12.7%.

Ohio County, West Virginia – Racial and ethnic composition Note: the US Census treats Hispanic/Latino as an ethnic category. This table excludes Latinos from the racial categories and assigns them to a separate category. Hispanics/Latinos may be of any race.
Race / Ethnicity (NH = Non-Hispanic)	Pop 2000	Pop 2010	Pop 2020	% 2000	% 2010	% 2020
White alone (NH)	44,633	41,163	37,559	94.11%	92.62%	88.53%
Black or African American alone (NH)	1,679	1,614	1,656	3.54%	3.63%	3.90%
Native American or Alaska Native alone (NH)	38	56	67	0.08%	0.13%	0.16%
Asian alone (NH)	365	365	387	0.77%	0.82%	0.91%
Pacific Islander alone (NH)	12	5	20	0.03%	0.01%	0.05%
Other race alone (NH)	51	49	134	0.11%	0.11%	0.32%
Mixed race or Multiracial (NH)	411	829	1,955	0.87%	1.87%	4.61%
Hispanic or Latino (any race)	238	362	647	0.50%	0.81%	1.53%
Total	47,427	44,443	42,425	100.00%	100.00%	100.00%

=== 2010 census ===
As of the census of 2010, there were 44,443 people, 18,914 households, and 11,181 families residing in the county. The population density was 420.0 inhabitants per square mile (162.2/km^{2}). There were 21,172 housing units at an average density of 200.1 per square mile (77.3/km^{2}). The racial makeup of the county was 93.2% white, 3.7% black or African American, 0.8% Asian, 0.1% American Indian, 0.2% from other races, and 1.9% from two or more races. Those of Hispanic or Latino origin made up 0.8% of the population. In terms of ancestry, 34.0% were German, 19.1% were Irish, 14.4% were English, 8.5% were Italian, 7.2% were Polish, and 5.7% were American.

Of the 18,914 households, 24.6% had children under the age of 18 living with them, 43.4% were married couples living together, 11.7% had a female householder with no husband present, 40.9% were non-families, and 35.3% of all households were made up of individuals. The average household size was 2.21 and the average family size was 2.86. The median age was 43.5 years.

The median income for a household in the county was $39,669 and the median income for a family was $54,909. Males had a median income of $42,213 versus $28,211 for females. The per capita income for the county was $23,950. About 11.9% of families and 15.9% of the population were below the poverty line, including 25.2% of those under age 18 and 9.0% of those age 65 or over.

=== 2000 census ===
As of the census of 2000, there were 47,427 people, 19,733 households, and 12,155 families residing in the county. The population density was 447 people per square mile (173 people/km^{2}). There were 22,166 housing units at an average density of 209 per square mile (81/km^{2}). The racial makeup of the county was 94.50% White, 3.57% Black or African American, 0.09% Native American, 0.78% Asian, 0.03% Pacific Islander, 0.13% from other races, and 0.91% from two or more races. 0.50% of the population were Hispanic or Latino of any race. 27.0% were of German, 13.7% Irish, 10.4% English, 8.4% Italian, 8.3% American and 6.7% Polish ancestry.

There were 19,733 households, out of which 25.90% had children under the age of 18 living with them, 47.30% were married couples living together, 11.20% had a female householder with no husband present, and 38.40% were non-families. 33.70% of all households were made up of individuals, and 16.00% had someone living alone who was 65 years of age or older. The average household size was 2.27 and the average family size was 2.91.

In the county, the population was spread out, with 21.30% under the age of 18, 10.50% from 18 to 24, 25.10% from 25 to 44, 24.40% from 45 to 64, and 18.80% who were 65 years of age or older. The median age was 41 years. For every 100 females there were 87.80 males. For every 100 females age 18 and over, there were 84.00 males.

The median income for a household in the county was $30,836, and the median income for a family was $41,261. Males had a median income of $31,132 versus $21,978 for females. The per capita income for the county was $17,734. About 11.50% of families and 15.80% of the population were below the poverty line, including 20.10% of those under age 18 and 10.40% of those age 65 or over.

== Government ==
Ohio County is governed by a three-member county commission. The three county commissioners are elected from single-member magisterial districts and serve six-year terms, staggered so that one seat is up for election every even year. The County Commission annually chooses its own President. The Ohio County Commissioners are Commission President Randy Wharton, Zachary Abraham, and Don Nickerson. The county commission typically appoints a county administrator to oversee the daily executive duties for the commission. The current county administrator is Randy Russell. In addition to the three members of the county commission, other elected officials include a county clerk, currently Michael E. Kelly, and a county assessor, currently Tiffany Hoffmann.

Ohio County is part of the West Virginia's First Judicial Circuit, which also includes nearby Hancock and Brooke counties. In West Virginia, circuit judges are elected in non-partisan elections to eight-year terms. The current judges of the First Judicial Circuit are Jason A. Cuomo, Michael J. Olejasz, David Sims, and Ronald E. Wilson. The clerk of the circuit court is elected in a partisan election and serves a six-year term. The current clerk of the First Judicial Circuit in Ohio County is Brenda Miller. Ohio County is part of the First Family Court Circuit of West Virginia, which covers the same three territories as the First Judicial Circuit. In West Virginia, Family Court judges have been elected to eight-year terms since 2008. The current judges of the First Family Circuit are Joyce D. Chernenko and Heather Wood.

Magistrates are elected in non-partisan elections serving four-year terms. Vacancies occurring in unexpired terms can be filled by a respective Circuit Court judge. Unlike Circuit Court and Family Court judges, magistrates are not required to be attorneys. Ohio County currently has four magistrates: Charles W. Murphy, Patricia L. Murphy, Joseph E. Roxby, and Janine L. Varner.

In West Virginia, prosecuting attorneys in each county are elected in partisan elections to four-year terms, currently Scott R. Smith. County sheriffs (who also serve ex-officio as county treasurer) are elected by each county to a four-year term, currently Thomas J. Howard. They are limited to two terms.

=== Proposed metro government ===
In 2006, the West Virginia Legislature adopted a new section to the West Virginia code – Chapter 7A – which provided for the consolidation of cities, cities with counties, or counties with counties. Interest has been expressed by some Ohio County residents and officials and has become the main political endeavour of a local council of churches called "Hopeful City". As of March 2007, no official action has been taken in Ohio County on this matter. Other municipalities in West Virginia are considering consolidation including Beckley-Raleigh County and Fairmont-Marion County. The most significant proposals under this legislation include a consolidation of Wirt County with Wood County and a population consolidation for Kanawha-Putnam-Cabell counties.

== Politics ==
In the West Virginia Senate, Ohio County is in the first Senate district, along with Hancock, Brooke, and part of Marshall counties. The district is represented by Laura Wakim Chapman (R-Wheeling) and Ryan Weld (R-Wellsburg).

In the West Virginia House of Delegates, parts of Ohio County are represented by the third, fourth, and fifth House of Delegates districts. The third district is represented by Delegate Jimmy Willis (R-Brooke County). The fourth district is represented by Bill Flanigan (R-Wheeling). The fifth district is represented by Delegate Shawn Fluharty (D-Wheeling). All delegates to the state House serve two-year terms.

In the United States House of Representatives, Ohio County is part of the West Virginia's 2nd congressional district, which includes nearly all of the northern part of the state. The current Representative is Alex Mooney, a Republican from Charles Town in Jefferson County. West Virginia's two senators, who represent the entire state, are Shelley Moore Capito and Jim Justice, both Republicans.

Although powerfully Unionist during the Civil War, Ohio County politics differs substantially from the two more northerly counties of the Northern Panhandle. The county was a competitive swing county for most of the period between Reconstruction and the end of the twentieth century, voting for the popular vote winner in every election except 1916, 1968 and 1976. Since 2000, like all of West Virginia, its conservative white voters have trended Republican due to a combination of declining unionization and differences with the Democratic Party's liberal views on social issues. The trend in the county has been less extreme than in most counties of the state.

United States presidential election results for Ohio County, West Virginia
Year	Republican		Democratic		Third party(ies)	
Year	No.	%	No.	%	No.	%
1912	3,956	28.31%	5,771	41.30%	4,245	30.38%
1916	7,349	52.75%	6,074	43.60%	509	3.65%
1920	15,735	58.62%	10,278	38.29%	829	3.09%
1924	14,402	54.09%	8,753	32.87%	3,471	13.04%
1928	20,064	60.04%	13,132	39.30%	219	0.66%
1932	15,836	45.25%	18,625	53.22%	532	1.52%
1936	13,743	37.39%	22,899	62.30%	116	0.32%
1940	18,073	45.43%	21,713	54.57%	0	0.00%
1944	16,165	48.10%	17,445	51.90%	0	0.00%
1948	15,757	47.54%	16,995	51.27%	395	1.19%
1952	20,575	55.43%	16,546	44.57%	0	0.00%
1956	22,165	62.69%	13,191	37.31%	0	0.00%
1960	17,367	48.52%	18,423	51.48%	0	0.00%
1964	12,006	36.18%	21,178	63.82%	0	0.00%
1968	13,073	43.20%	15,026	49.65%	2,164	7.15%
1972	18,435	63.73%	10,491	36.27%	0	0.00%
1976	12,476	51.36%	11,817	48.64%	0	0.00%
1980	11,414	47.81%	10,973	45.96%	1,486	6.22%
1984	13,447	56.83%	10,163	42.95%	52	0.22%
1988	10,341	50.25%	10,121	49.18%	116	0.56%
1992	7,421	35.97%	9,522	46.15%	3,690	17.88%
1996	7,267	39.92%	8,781	48.23%	2,158	11.85%
2000	9,607	53.48%	7,653	42.60%	704	3.92%
2004	11,694	57.35%	8,543	41.89%	155	0.76%
2008	10,694	54.73%	8,593	43.98%	253	1.29%
2012	10,768	59.96%	6,786	37.79%	405	2.26%
2016	11,139	61.16%	5,493	30.16%	1,582	8.69%
2020	12,354	62.08%	7,223	36.30%	323	1.62%
2024	11,593	62.03%	6,727	35.99%	369	1.97%

== Education ==
=== Colleges and universities ===
- West Liberty University
- Wheeling University
- West Virginia Northern Community College

=== Public schools ===
All public schools within Ohio County operate under the jurisdiction of Ohio County Schools with the consolidated high school housing grades 9–12, middle schools housing grades 6–8, and elementary schools housing grades K–5.

Ohio County Schools has a five-member elected Board of Education Board of Education (Molly J. Aderholt, Christine N. Carder, David Croft, Sarah C. Koegler, President Zachary T. Abraham, Superintendent Dr. Kimmberly Miller, and an Assistant Superintendent Rick Jones. In addition, the Board of Education has an Attendance Director (Wm. Jeffrey Laird).

- Wheeling Park High School
- Bridge Street Middle School
- Triadelphia Middle School
- Warwood Middle School
- Wheeling Middle School
- Bethlehem Elementary School
- Elm Grove Elementary School
- Madison Elementary School
- Middle Creek Elementary School
- Ritchie Elementary School
- Steenrod Elementary School
- Warwood Elementary School
- Warwood Middle School
- Woodsdale Elementary School

=== Private and parochial schools ===
The Diocese of Wheeling-Charleston operates several K–8 schools and one high school in Ohio County.

- Wheeling Central Catholic High School
- Corpus Christi Parish School
- Our Lady of Peace School (located in Marshall County but also serves Ohio County students)
- St. Michael Parish School
- St. Vincent de Paul Parish School
- Wheeling Catholic Elementary (closed)

Additionally, there are two private schools in Ohio County.

- Linsly School
- Wheeling Country Day School

== Communities ==
=== City ===
- Wheeling (county seat; partly in Marshall County)

=== Towns ===
- Triadelphia
- West Liberty

=== Villages ===
- Bethlehem
- Clearview
- Valley Grove

=== Magisterial districts ===
- District 1
- District 2
- District 3

=== Unincorporated communities ===
- Betty Zane
- Clinton
- Eden
- Elm Grove
- Greggsville
- Mount Echo
- Mozart
- Point Mills
- Potomac
- Roneys Point
- Shannon
- Twilight
- Valley Camp
- Warwood
- Whitfield

== Public attractions ==
The Ohio County Fair is held annually in October at Site 1 in Oglebay Park.

=== Dog races and gaming ===
In 2007, the West Virginia Legislature adopted HB2718 which created Chapter 29-22 C of the West Virginia Code and permits county residents where racetracks are located to vote on expansion to table games. Ohio County was the first county in West Virginia to take action concerning the matter when the Ohio County Commission initiated a special election date of June 9 for the referendum. The ballot initiative successfully passed in Ohio County with 66% of the vote. The measure permits Wheeling Island Racetrack and Gaming Center to operate table games such as blackjack and poker. On June 9, Jefferson County voters rejected their ballot measure. On June 30, Hancock County voters approved their ballot measure. Kanawha County has scheduled a special election for August 11. While the West Virginia Family Foundation vowed to challenge the constitutionality of HB 2718, it announced on August 7 that it would not file any appeal on the matter. According to newspaper accounts, the West Virginia Lottery Commission has set November 1, 2007, as the latest date at which table games will begin preliminary operation at Wheeling Island Racetrack and Gaming Center.

== Notable residents ==
- George W. Atkinson (R) – Governor of West Virginia (1897–1901);
- Nathan B. Scott (R) – U.S. Senator (1899–1911)
- Walter L. Fisher (R) – United States Secretary of the Interior (1911–1913)

== See also ==
- Bear Rock Lakes Wildlife Management Area
- Castleman Run Lake Wildlife Management Area
- National Register of Historic Places listings in Ohio County, West Virginia
