= List of U.S. Routes in Ohio =

U.S. Numbered Highways in Ohio
- Highway markers for U.S. Routes 6, 62, and 224

Highway names
- Interstates: Interstate nn (I-nn)
- US Highways: U.S. Route nn (US nn)
- State: State Route nn (SR nn)

System links
- Ohio State Highway System; Interstate; US; State; Scenic

U.S. Routes in Ohio are the components of the United States Numbered Highway System that are located in the U.S. state of Ohio. They are owned by the state, and maintained by the Ohio Department of Transportation (ODOT) except in cities.

== U.S. Routes ==
Number	Length (mi)	Length (km)	Southern or western terminus	Northern or eastern terminus	Formed	Removed	Notes
US 6	248.09	399.26	US 6 in Edgerton	US 6 in Pierpont	1931	current	Also known as the Grand Army of the Republic Highway.
US 20	260.54	419.30	US 20 near Edon	US 20 near Conneaut	1926	current	
US 20N	—	—	—	—	—	—	
US 20S	—	—	—	—	—	—	
US 21	—	—	US 21 in Marietta	US 6/US 20/US 42/US 322/US 422/ SR 3/SR 8/SR 14/SR 43/SR 87 in Cleveland	1926	1971	Replaced by I-77
US 22	243.32	391.59	West 9th Street and Central Avenue in Downtown Cincinnati	US 22 at the West Virginia state line (Veterans Memorial Bridge) in Steubenville	1926	current	
US 23	234.83	377.92	US 23 in Portsmouth	US 23 in Sylvania	1926	current	
US 24	83.33	134.11	US 24 at the Indiana state line	US 24 in Toledo	1926	current	Fort-to-Port
US 25	208.18	335.03	US 25 in Cincinnati	US 25 in Toledo	1926	1974	Enters Ohio via a bridge to Cincinnati from Kentucky; it is Kentucky maintained, however. In Ohio, US 25 was replaced by US 127, US 24, SR 25, CR 25A, and I-75.
US 27	40.54	65.24	US 27 in Cincinnati	US 27 near College Corner	1926	current	
US 30	247.01	397.52	US 30 northeast of Monroeville, IN	US 30 at West Virginia state line (Jennings Randolph Bridge) in East Liverpool	1926	current	
US 30N	—	—	—	—	1932	1974	
US 30S	—	—	—	—	1932	1974	Replaced by SR 309
US 33	236.80	381.09	US 33 near Willshire	US 33 southeast of Pomeroy	1937	current	
US 35	174.43	280.72	US 35 near New Paris	US 35 in Gallipolis	1934	current	
US 36	208.42	335.42	US 36 near Palestine	US 250/SR 800 in Uhrichsville	1926	current	
US 40	227.80	366.61	US 40 near New Paris	US 40/US 250 in Bridgeport	1926	current	
US 42	244.63	393.69	US 25/US 42/US 127 in Cincinnati	Public Square, Cleveland	1926	current	
US 50	204.24	328.69	US 50 near Cleves	US 50 near Belpre	1926	current	
US 50N	—	—	—	—	1926	1935	Replaced by US 50A and later SR 550
US 50S	—	—	—	—	1926	1935	Replaced by US 50
US 52	180.89	291.11	I-74/US 52 near Harrison	US 52 in Chesapeake	1926	current	
US 62	294.83	474.48	US 62/US 68 near Aberdeen	US 62 in Masury	1932	current	
US 68	178.97	288.02	US 62/US 68 near Aberdeen	I-75/SR 15 in Findlay	1933	current	
US 127	194.27	312.65	US 25/US 42/US 127 in Cincinnati	US 127 near Alvordton	1926	current	
US 223	0.66	1.06	US 23, SR 51 & SR 184 in Sylvania	US 23/US 223 at the Michigan state line	1930	current	Completely concurrent with US 23 in Ohio
US 224	238.50	383.83	US 224 near Wren	US 224 near Lowellville	—	—	
US 250	161.81	260.41	US 40/US 250 in Bridgeport	US 6 in Sandusky	—	—	
US 322	62.21	100.12	Public Square, Cleveland	US 322 near Williamsfield	1926	current	
US 422	74.94	120.60	Public Square, Cleveland	US 422 near Campbell	1926	current	
Former

== Special routes ==
Number	Length (mi)	Length (km)	Southern or western terminus	Northern or eastern terminus	Formed	Removed	Notes
US 6 Bus.	—	—	—	—	—	—	Serves Napoleon
US 6 Alt.	—	—	Sandusky	Huron	—	—	
US 6 Alt.	7.30	11.75	US 6 in Rocky River	Cleveland	1969	current	
US 6 Alt.	—	—	Cleveland	East Cleveland	—	—	
US 6 Alt.	—	—	Euclid	Chardon	—	—	
US 20A	52.44	84.39	US 20 near Pioneer	US 20 near Toledo	1935	current	
US 20 Bus.	—	—	Toledo	Gibsonburg Junction	—	—	
US 20 Truck	—	—	—	—	—	—	Serves Perrysburg
US 20 Bus.	—	—	—	—	—	—	Serves Fremont
US 20A	—	—	Rocky River	Cleveland	—	—	
US 20A	—	—	Cleveland	East Cleveland	—	—	
Temp. US 21	—	—	Cuyahoga Heights	Cleveland	—	—	
US 23 Truck	—	—	Kentucky-Ohio state line	Portsmouth	—	—	
US 23 Bus.	—	—	—	—	—	—	Serves Chillicothe
US 23 Bus.	—	—	Perrysburg	Toledo	—	—	
US 24 Alt.	—	—	Toledo	Ohio-Michigan state line	—	—	Originally Alt. US 25.
US 24 Bus.	—	—	Perrysburg	Toledo	—	—	
US 25 Bus.	—	—	Perrysburg	Toledo	—	—	
US 25 Bus.	—	—	Toledo	Ohio-Michigan state line	—	—	Later renamed Alt. US 24
US 25 Bus.	—	—	—	—	—	—	Served Toledo
City US 27	—	—	Kentucky-Ohio state line	Cincinnati	—	—	
Temp. US 27	—	—	Kentucky-Ohio state line	Cincinnati	—	—	
US 27 Truck	—	—	—	—	—	—	Serves Cincinnati
US 30 Bus.	—	—	—	—	—	—	Serves Van Wert
US 30 Bus.	—	—	—	—	—	—	Serves Upper Sandusky
US 30 Bus.	—	—	—	—	—	—	Serves Bucyrus
US 30 Alt.	2.22	3.57	US 30 west of Dalton	US 30 east of Dalton	1963	current	
US 33 Bus.	—	—	—	—	—	—	Serves Nelsonville
Temp. US 35	—	—	West Virginia-Ohio state line	Kanauga	—	—	
US 35 Bus.	—	—	—	—	—	—	Serves Jackson
US 35 Bus.	—	—	—	—	—	—	Serves Xenia
US 35 Byp.	—	—	—	—	—	—	Served Xenia
Temp. US 36	—	—	Baker	Greenville	—	—	
Temp. US 40	—	—	Columbus	Bexley	—	—	
US 42 Alt.	—	—	Cincinnati	Sharonville	—	—	
US 50 Byp.	—	—	Cleves	Milford	—	—	
US 50 Truck	—	—	—	—	—	—	Served Cincinnati
US 50 Alt.	—	—	—	—	1935	1976	Replaced by SR 550
US 50 Bus.	—	—	—	—	—	—	Served Belpre
US 52 Bus.	—	—	Hanging Rock	Coal Grove	—	—	
Temp. US 62	—	—	—	—	1998	current	Serves Alliance
US 68 Alt.	—	—	Kentucky-Ohio state line	Aberdeen	—	—	
US 68 Bus.	—	—	Kentucky-Ohio state line	Aberdeen	—	—	
US 68 Byp.	—	—	—	—	—	—	Served Springfield
US 127 Truck	—	—	—	—	—	—	Serves Cincinnati
US 127 Alt.	—	—	—	—	—	—	Served Hamilton
US 127 Bus.	—	—	—	—	—	—	Served Greenville
US 224 Bus.	—	—	—	—	—	—	Serves Van Wert
US 224 Alt.	—	—	Boardman	Poland	—	—	
US 250 Bus.	—	—	—	—	—	—	Serves New Philadelphia
Temp. US 250	—	—	Silver Road Junction	Jefferson	—	—	
Former
