= Interstate 70 in West Virginia =

Highway in West Virginia

Interstate 70
- Location of I-70 (in red) in West Virginia

Route information
- Maintained by WVDOH
- Length: 14.45 mi (23.26 km)
- Existed: 1963–present
- NHS: Entire route

Major junctions
- West end: I-70 at the Ohio state line in Bridgeport, Ohio
- US 40 / US 250 in Wheeling; I-470 in Wheeling
- East end: I-70 at the Pennsylvania state line in West Alexander, Pennsylvania

Location
- Country: United States
- State: West Virginia
- Counties: Ohio

Highway system
- Interstate Highway System; Main; Auxiliary; Suffixed; Business; Future; West Virginia State Highway System; Interstate; US; State
← WV 69	→ WV 71

Interstate 70 (I-70) is a portion of the US Interstate Highway System that runs from near Cove Fort, Utah, at a junction with I-15 to Baltimore, Maryland. It crosses the Northern Panhandle of West Virginia through Ohio County and the city of Wheeling. This segment is the shortest of all states through which I-70 passes, crossing West Virginia for only 14.45 miles (23.26 km). The Fort Henry Bridge carries I-70 from Wheeling Island across the Ohio River and into downtown Wheeling before the freeway enters the Wheeling Tunnel. I-470, a southerly bypass of Wheeling and the lone auxiliary Interstate Highway in West Virginia, is intersected near Elm Grove. Before crossing into Pennsylvania, I-70 passes The Highlands, a major shopping center in the panhandle, and the Bear Rocks Lake Wildlife Management Area. On average, between 27,000 and 53,000 vehicles use the freeway every day.

The first road that entered Wheeling was a post road completed in 1794 that connected Wheeling to Morgantown. The National Road was the first interstate road, completed in 1818, that connected Wheeling to Cumberland, Maryland. When the United States Numbered Highway System was created in 1926, the National Road was designated U.S. Route 40 (US 40). The I-70 designation was brought to the Northern Panhandle with the passage of the Federal-Aid Highway Act of 1956, and it was built as a controlled-access highway, bypassing portions of the old National Road. The first portions of I-70 in West Virginia were opened in 1963, and construction was completed in 1971.

== Route description ==
Entering West Virginia from Ohio, I-70 crosses the western channel of the Ohio River onto Wheeling Island, the most populated island along the Ohio River. The freeway passes above a light commercial zone and has an interchange with Zane Street. US 40 and US 250 become concurrent with I-70 at this interchange, before traveling east toward the Fort Henry Bridge. The bridge crosses the main channel of the river and the Greater Wheeling Trail, a rail trail that parallels the eastern banks of the river. Elevated above the city of Wheeling, a complex interchange provides access to the downtown area and Benwood. Traveling eastbound, US 40 departs the freeway at this interchange and becomes concurrent with West Virginia Route 2 (WV 2) northbound. US 40 and WV 2 travel through downtown Wheeling on a one-way pair, the southbound lanes passing under I-70 and the northbound lanes passing over I-70. After the interchange, I-70 enters the approximately 0.25-mile-long (0.40 km) Wheeling Tunnel which passes through Wheeling Hill. Immediately east of the tunnel, a directional T interchange provides access to WV 2 southbound near homes north of the highway. US 250 departs I-70 at this interchange. A stub ramp present at this interchange would have carried WV 2 north of I-70 had it been extended.

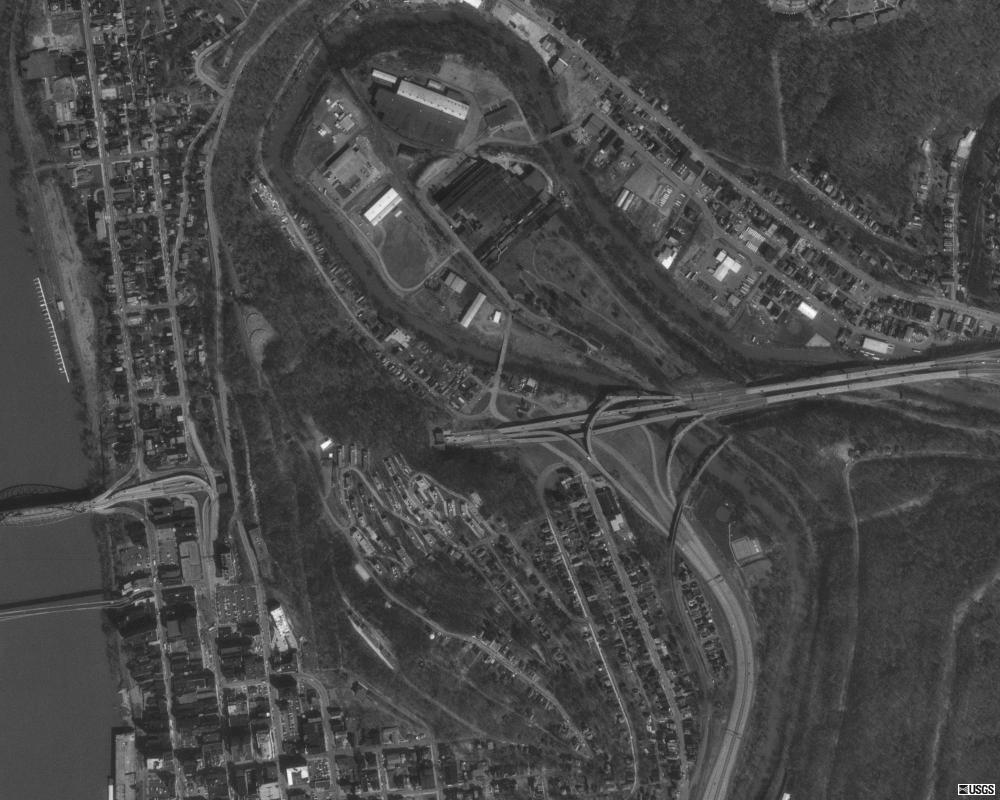
An overhead view of Wheeling Hill

As I-70 curves to the south, it intersects US 40 and WV 88 with the ramps from the eastbound lanes of US 40 and WV 88 crossing underneath I-70, parallel to Wheeling Creek. The interchange just west of the Wheeling Tunnel and this interchange are complicated by the fact that both are abutted by hills. Wheeling University's southeastern border is formed by the freeway as I-70 approaches the neighborhood of Elm Grove. Washington Avenue provides access to the college as the highway continues south before meeting the eastern terminus of I-470, which is a bypass of Wheeling and the only auxiliary Interstate Highway in West Virginia. Between the directional T interchange and I-470, I-70 is paralleled by the eastern branch of the Greater Wheeling Trail. A final interchange within Wheeling city limits provides access to US 40 and WV 88. Leaving the city, the highway turns further east and enters a deep valley. The highway climbs over Two-Mile Hill and intersects Cabela Drive (County Route 65, CR 65), which provides access to The Highlands, a large shopping destination. Past The Highlands, I-70 continues northeast though woodlands to an interchange with the Dallas Pike (CR 41). I-70 passes north of the Bear Rocks Lake Wildlife Management Area before crossing the Pennsylvania state line into Washington County southwest of West Alexander.

Out of the 10 states I-70 passes through, the 14.45-mile-long (23.26 km) segment in West Virginia is the shortest. By comparison, the longest stretch of I-70 through a single state is the 451.04-mile-long (725.88 km) segment in Colorado. Every year, the West Virginia Department of Transportation (WVDOT) conducts a series of surveys on its highways in the state to measure traffic volume. This is expressed in terms of annual average daily traffic (AADT), a measure of traffic volume for any average day of the year. In 2012, WVDOT calculated that as few as 27,000 vehicles traveled over the Fort Henry Bridge over the Ohio River, and as many as 53,000 vehicles used the highway near its junction with US 40 in Elm Grove. These counts are of the portion of the freeway in West Virginia and are not reflective of the entire Interstate. As part of the Interstate Highway System, the entire route is listed on the National Highway System, a system of roads that are important to the nation's economy, defense, and mobility.

== History ==
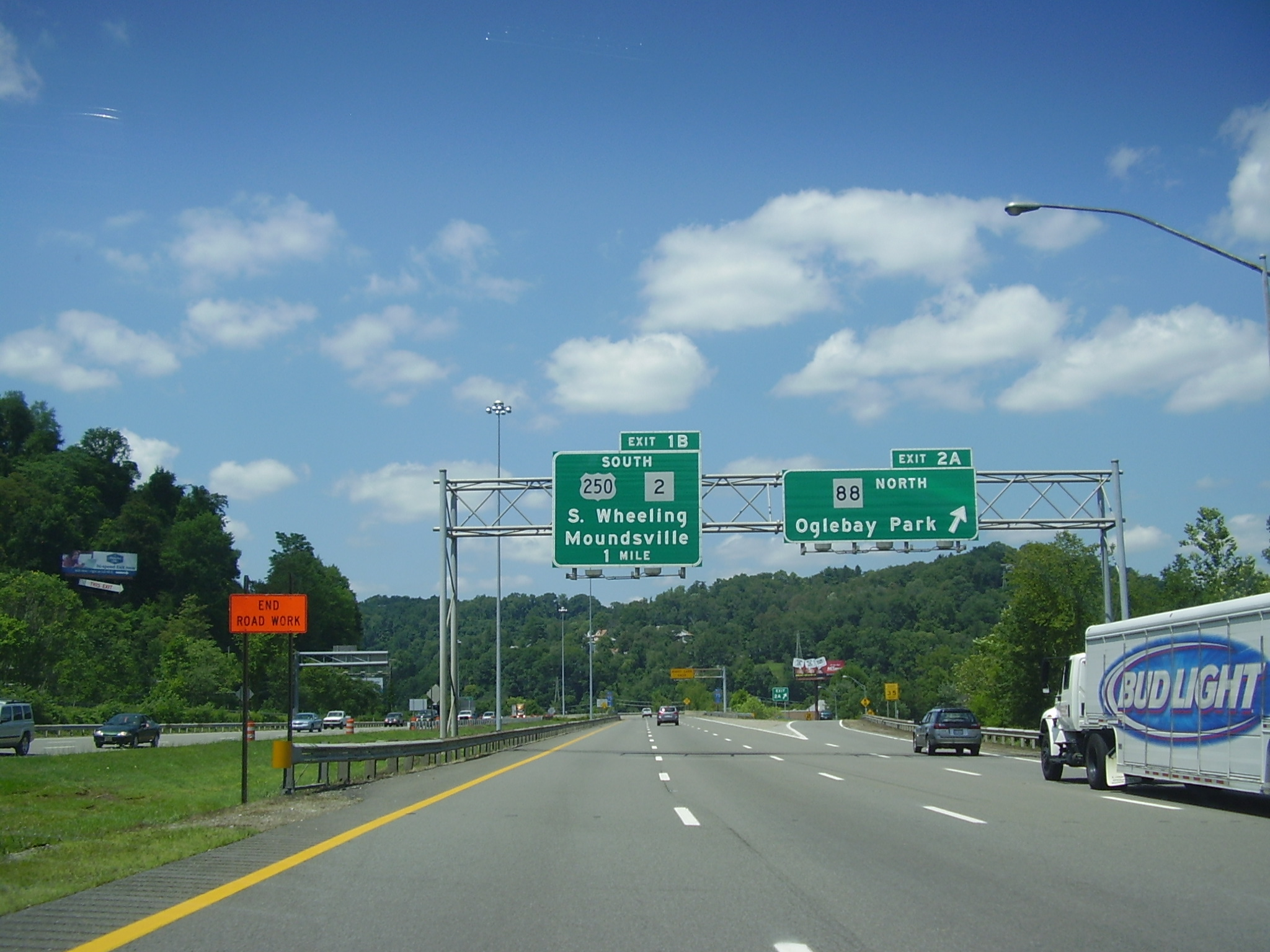
I-70 westbound near the campus of Wheeling University

The first recorded road to reach what was then Wheeling, Virginia, was a post road linking it with Morgantown, to the southeast. The post road was completed in 1794. The National Road was the first interstate road that served Wheeling, linking the town to Cumberland, Maryland, in the east. The National Road started construction under order of then President Thomas Jefferson in 1806 and was completed in 1818. In 1926, the United States Numbered Highway System was established, and the National Road through the Northern Panhandle was designated US 40. US 40 linked Vallejo, California, in the west to Atlantic City, New Jersey, in the east. Passage of the Federal-Aid Highway Act of 1956 formed the Interstate Highway System, designating as I-70 a then unconstructed controlled-access highway across the panhandle by 1957. Since it was constructed as a separate controlled-access highway, much of I-70 is separate from the old National Road and US 40.

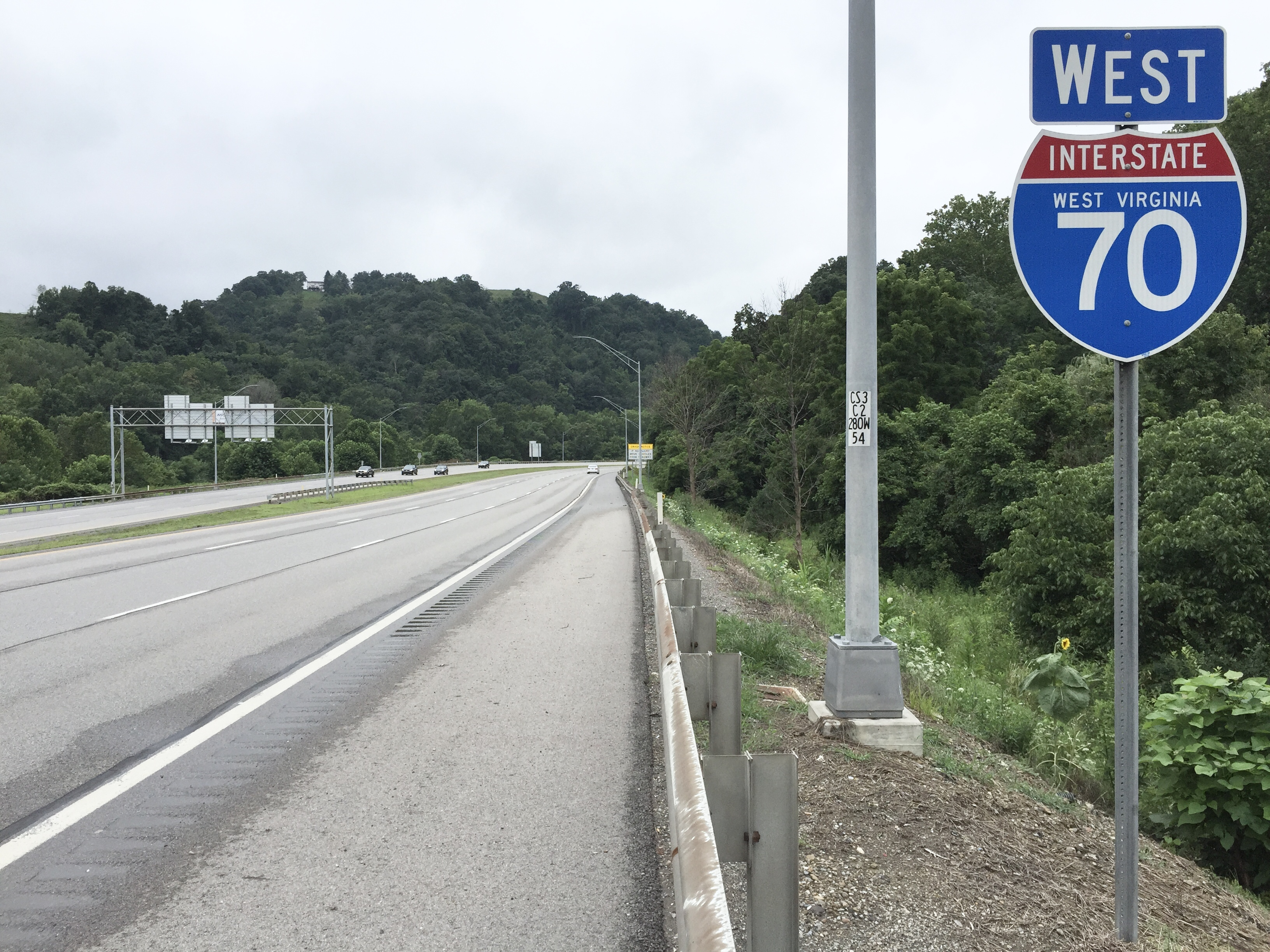
View west along I-70 in Wheeling, just after the interchange with I-470

The first portion of what is now known as I-70 to be completed across West Virginia was the Fort Henry Bridge across the main channel of the Ohio River, built in 1955. WVDOT began obtaining right-of-way for I-70 in 1961. The Wheeling Tunnel, linking downtown Wheeling and the Fort Henry Bridge to the eastern suburb of Elm Grove, was completed in 1967 at a cost of $7 million (equivalent to $50.1 million in 2024). The bridge that carries I-70 from the Ohio state line onto Wheeling Island was completed in 1968. Construction of I-70 across the panhandle was almost completed in September 1971, with only one of the two carriageways completed in the final 1.2-mile-long (1.9 km) segment of freeway near Elm Grove. Then-Governor Arch A. Moore Jr. and Senator Jennings Randolph were present for the opening of this $17-million (equivalent to $101 million in 2024) portion of freeway. The second carriageway was completed by the end of 1971.

The Fort Henry Bridge, the Vietnam Veterans Memorial Bridge (which carries I-470), and the Wheeling Suspension Bridge were all closed in January 2005, stopping any traffic from Ohio or Wheeling Island from entering mainland West Virginia for a few days because barges broke loose during heavy flooding along the Ohio River. The Wheeling Tunnel was closed for reconstruction work in 2007, 2008, and 2010, causing motorists who wished to travel through on I-70 to detour. The two detour routes were city streets in downtown Wheeling and the I-470 loop.

After traffic issues during the 2008 reconstruction work on the Wheeling Tunnel, local politicians suggested closing the twin tunnels altogether and building the freeway over Wheeling Hill instead. After opposition from the NAACP, which represented the affected Wheeling Hill residents, the suggestions were dropped. The cost of completing the tunnel replacement project was estimated at between $60 and $80 million. The total $13.7-million cost of the tunnel reconstruction project was over double the original bid of $5.7 million, due in part to the work delays.

== Exit list ==
The entire route is in Ohio County.

Location	mi	km	Exit	Destinations	Notes
Ohio River	0.0	0.0		I-70 west – Columbus	Continuation into Ohio
Wheeling Island	0.3	0.48	0	US 40 west / US 250 north (Zane Street) – Wheeling Island	Western end of US 40/US 250 concurrency; westbound exit and eastbound entrance
Ohio River	0.5	0.80	Fort Henry Bridge		
Wheeling	0.7	1.1	1A	US 40 east / WV 2 north (Main Street) – Downtown Wheeling	Eastern end of US 40 concurrency
Wheeling	0.8– 1.1	1.3– 1.8	Wheeling Tunnel		
Wheeling	1.3	2.1	1B	US 250 south to WV 2 south – South Wheeling, Moundsville	Eastern end of US 250 concurrency
Wheeling	1.9	3.1	2A	US 40 to WV 88 north – Oglebay Park	
Wheeling	2.6	4.2	2B	CR 701 (Washington Avenue)	Access to Wheeling Jesuit University
Wheeling	4.5	7.2	4	US 40 (WV 88) – Elm Grove	Eastbound exit and westbound entrance
Wheeling	4.8	7.7	5A	I-470 west – Columbus	Westbound exit and eastbound entrance; eastern terminus of I-470
Wheeling	5.3	8.5	5	US 40 / WV 88 – Elm Grove, Triadelphia	
	9.5	15.3	10	CR 65 (Cabela Drive)	Access to The Highlands shopping complex
	10.9	17.5	11	CR 41 (Dallas Pike)	
	14.45	23.26		I-70 east – Washington	Continuation into Pennsylvania
1.000 mi = 1.609 km; 1.000 km = 0.621 mi: Concurrency terminus; Incomplete access

Interstate 70
Previous state: Ohio	West Virginia	Next state: Pennsylvania
