= U.S. Route 250 in West Virginia =

Section of U.S. Highway in West Virginia

U.S. Route 250
- Route of US 250 in West Virginia highlighted in red

Route information
- Auxiliary route of US 50
- Maintained by WVDOH
- Length: 185 mi (298 km)

Major junctions
- South end: US 40 / US 250 at the Ohio state line in Wheeling
- I-70 / US 40 / WV 2 in Wheeling; I-470 in Wheeling; US 19 in Fairmont; I-79 in White Hall; US 50 in Grafton; US 119 from Webster to Philippi; US 33 / US 48 from Norton to Elkins; US 219 / WV 55 from Elkins to Huttonsville
- North end: US 250 at the Virginia state line near Bartow

Location
- Country: United States
- State: West Virginia
- Counties: Ohio, Marshall, Wetzel, Marion, Taylor, Barbour, Randolph, Pocahontas

Highway system
- United States Numbered Highway System; List; Special; Divided; West Virginia State Highway System; Interstate; US; State
← WV 230	→ WV 251

U.S. Route 250 (US 250) is a United States Numbered Highway that runs from Sandusky, Ohio, to Richmond, Virginia. Within the state of West Virginia, the route runs from the Ohio border in Wheeling to the Virginia border near Thornwood.

== Route description ==
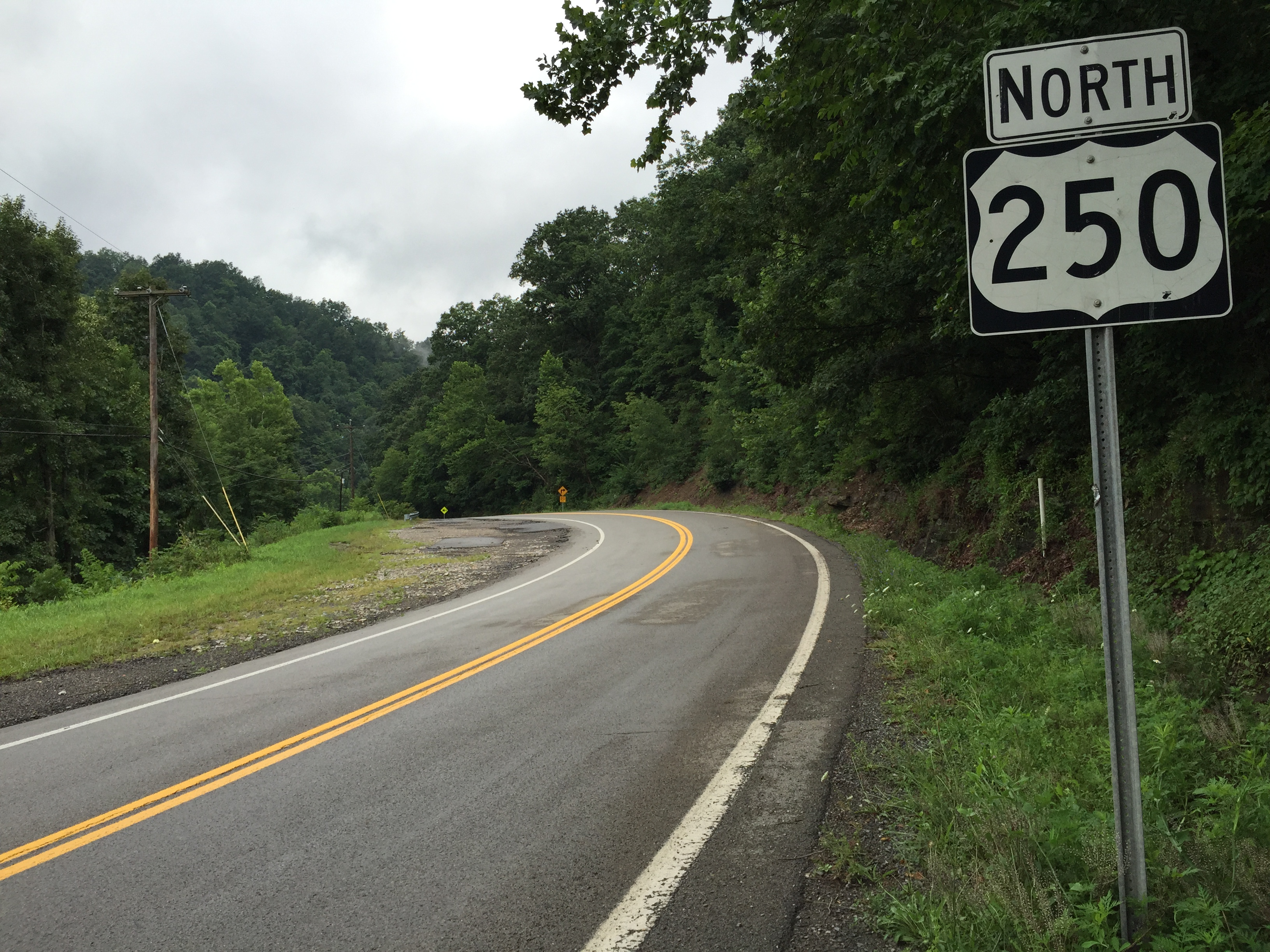
View north along US 250 in Hundred in rural northern West Virginia

U.S. 250's northern entrance into West Virginia is via the Military Order of the Purple Heart Bridge from Bridgeport, Ohio, onto Wheeling Island. It is briefly co-signed with U.S. Route 40. The route additionally co-signs with Interstate 70 and crosses the Ohio River on the Fort Henry Bridge in Wheeling, West Virginia. U.S. Route 250 then exits I-70 east of the Wheeling Tunnel and joins West Virginia Route 2 one mile (1.6 km) later. In Moundsville, West Virginia, the route leaves WV 2 and departs toward Cameron, Mannington, and Fairmont. It intersects with its parent route, U.S. Route 50, two miles west of Grafton in Pruntytown and continues southward, co-signed with U.S. Route 119 for 12 miles. The route moves through Philippi, and finally through Elkins. U.S. Route 250 intersects with U.S. Route 33 and U.S. Route 219 briefly in Elkins, which is the last major hub before U.S. Route 250 winds its way through the Appalachian Mountains to the Virginia border.

U.S. 250 in West Virginia includes the Philippi Covered Bridge at Philippi, the only covered bridge on the United States Numbered Highway System.

== History ==
Originally, US 250 ran from Norwalk, Ohio to end at US 50 in Grafton, West Virginia. Today, it runs from Sandusky, Ohio to Richmond, Virginia, passing its original eastern terminus.

== Major intersections ==
County	Location	mi	km	Exit	Destinations	Notes
Ohio	Wheeling	0.00	0.00		US 40 west / US 250 west / Historic National Road west to I-70 west / SR 7 – Bridgeport	Ohio state line (Military Order of the Purple Heart Bridge over Ohio River back channel)
Ohio	Wheeling				I-70 west – Columbus, OH	North end of I-70 overlap; westbound exit and eastbound entrance; US 250 north follows exit 0
Ohio	Wheeling	0.7	1.1	1A	US 40 east / WV 2 north (Main Street) – Downtown Wheeling	South end of US 40 overlap
Ohio	Wheeling	0.8– 1.1	1.3– 1.8	Wheeling Tunnel		
Ohio	Wheeling				I-70 east – Washington, PA	South end of I-70 overlap; US 250 south follows exit 1B
Ohio	Wheeling				McColloch Street	Northbound exit and southbound entrance
Ohio	Wheeling				16th Street	Southbound exit and northbound entrance
Ohio	Wheeling				WV 2 north (18th Street) – Downtown	North end of WV-2 overlap; northbound exit and southbound entrance
See WV-2
Marshall	Moundsville				WV 2 south	South end of WV-2 overlap
Marshall	Limestone				WV 88 north – Bethlehem	Southern terminus of WV-88
Marshall	Cameron				WV 891 east – Waynesburg PA	Western terminus of WV-891
Wetzel	Hundred				WV 69 north	Southern terminus of WV-69
Wetzel	Burton				WV 7 west – New Martinsville	west end of WV-7 overlap
Wetzel	Burton				WV 7 east – Morgantown	east end of WV-7 overlap
Marion	Farmington				WV 218 south – Worthington	North end of WV-218 overlap
Marion	Farmington				WV 218 north – Fairview	South end of WV-218 overlap
Marion	Fairmont				US 19	Access to Downtown Fairmont
Marion	Fairmont				WV 310 east	Western terminus of WV-310
Marion	White Hall				I-79 – Clarksburg, Morgantown	Exit 132 on I-79
Taylor	Grafton				US 50 west – Clarksburg	West end of US-50 overlap
Taylor	Grafton				US 50 east – Grafton	East end of US-50 overlap
Taylor	Webster				US 119 north – Grafton	North end of US-119 overlap
Barbour	Corder Crossing				WV 76 west	Eastern terminus of WV-76
Barbour	Philippi				US 119 south / US 250 Truck south – Buckhannon	South end of US-119 overlap
Barbour	Philippi			Philippi Covered Bridge over Roaring Creek		
Barbour	Philippi				US 250 Truck north (Blue and Gray Expressway) to US 119 – Buckhannon, Grafton	
Barbour	Philippi				WV 38 east – Parsons	Western terminus of WV-38
Barbour	Belington				WV 92 north – Morgantown	North end of WV-92 overlap
Randolph	Norton				US 33 west / US 48 west – Buckhannon	North end of US-33 / US 48 overlaps
Randolph	Aggregates				WV 92 south (Harrison Avenue) – Crystal Springs	South end of WV 92 overlap
Randolph	Elkins				US 48 east / US 219 north – Parsons	South end of US 48 overlap; north end of US 219 overlap
Randolph	Elkins				WV 92 north (Harrison Avenue)	North end of WV 92 overlap
Randolph	Elkins				US 33 / WV 55 east – Seneca Rocks	South end of US 33 overlap; north end of WV 55 overlap
Randolph	Huttonsville				US 219 south / WV 55 west – Marlinton	South end of US 219/WV 55 overlaps
Pocahontas	Bartow				WV 28 south / WV 92 south – Minnehaha Springs	South end of WV 92 overlap; north end of WV-28 overlap
Pocahontas	Thornwood				WV 28 north – Seneca Rocks	North end of WV-28 overlap
Pocahontas					US 250 east – Staunton	Virginia state line
1.000 mi = 1.609 km; 1.000 km = 0.621 mi: Concurrency terminus; Incomplete access

== Philippi truck route ==
U.S. Route 250 Truck
- Location: Philippi
- Length: 0.94 mi (1,510 m)

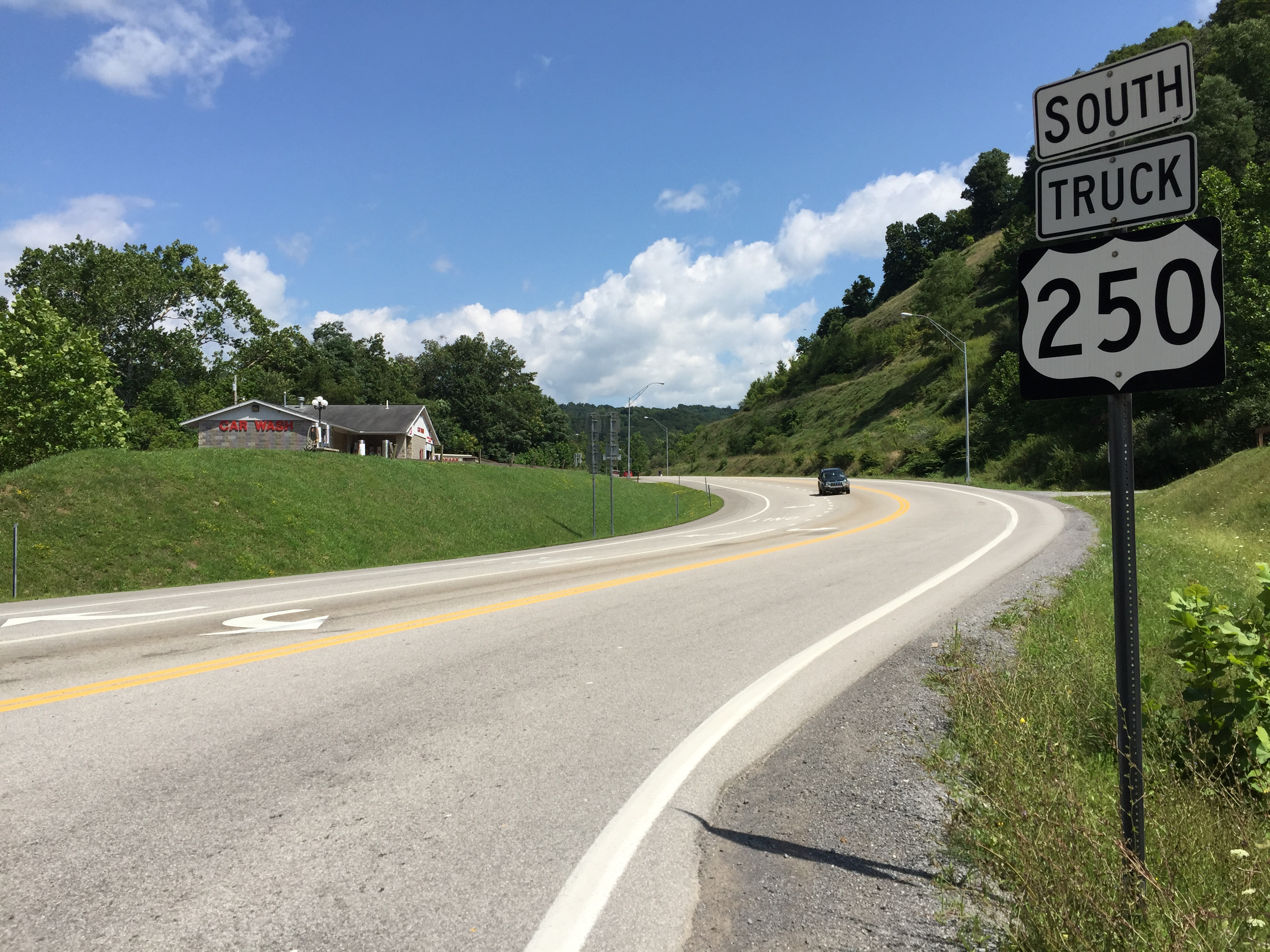
View south along US 250 Truck at US 119 in Philippi

U.S. Route 250 Truck follows Blue and Gray Expressway around the south and west sides of downtown Philippi, avoiding the covered bridge. The entire route is in Philippi, Barbour County.

mi	km	Destinations	Notes
0.00	0.00	US 119 north / US 250 – Grafton, Elkins	Northern terminus; northern end of concurrency with US 119
0.11	0.18	US 119 south – Buckhannon	Southern end of concurrency with US 119
0.44– 0.51	0.71– 0.82	Rick Everson Bridge over Tygart Valley River	
0.94	1.51	US 250 (South Main Street) – Grafton, Elkins	Southern terminus
1.000 mi = 1.609 km; 1.000 km = 0.621 mi: Concurrency terminus
