= West Virginia Route 2 =

State highway in West Virginia, United States

West Virginia Route 2

Route information
- Maintained by WVDOH
- Length: 230.6 mi (371.1 km)
- Existed: 1920s–present

Major junctions
- South end: US 60 in Huntington
- US 35 near Pt. Pleasant; US 50 near Parkersburg; I-77 from Silverton to Parkersburg; US 250 from Moundsville to Wheeling; I-470 in Wheeling; I-70 in Wheeling; US 40 in Wheeling; US 22 in Weirton
- North end: US 30 in Chester

Location
- Country: United States
- State: West Virginia
- Counties: Hancock, Brooke, Ohio, Marshall, Wetzel, Tyler, Pleasants, Wood, Jackson, Mason, Cabell

Highway system
- West Virginia State Highway System; Interstate; US; State
← WV 972	→ WV 3

West Virginia Route 2 is a state highway in the US state of West Virginia. It generally parallels the Ohio River along the western border of the state, from U.S. Route 60 in Huntington (just west of the East End Bridge) northeasterly to U.S. Route 30 in Chester (just south of the Jennings Randolph Memorial Bridge).

WV 2 leaves the shores of the Ohio River in two places: between Point Pleasant and Mount Alto (where West Virginia Route 62 follows the river) and between Ravenswood and Waverly (where West Virginia Route 68 mostly follows the river). The entire route is included as a part of the National Highway System, a system of routes determined to be the most important for the nation's economy, mobility, and defense. The highway is also somewhat parallel with Ohio Route 7, which can be spotted from the Ohio River.

== Route ==
=== Huntington to Parkersburg ===
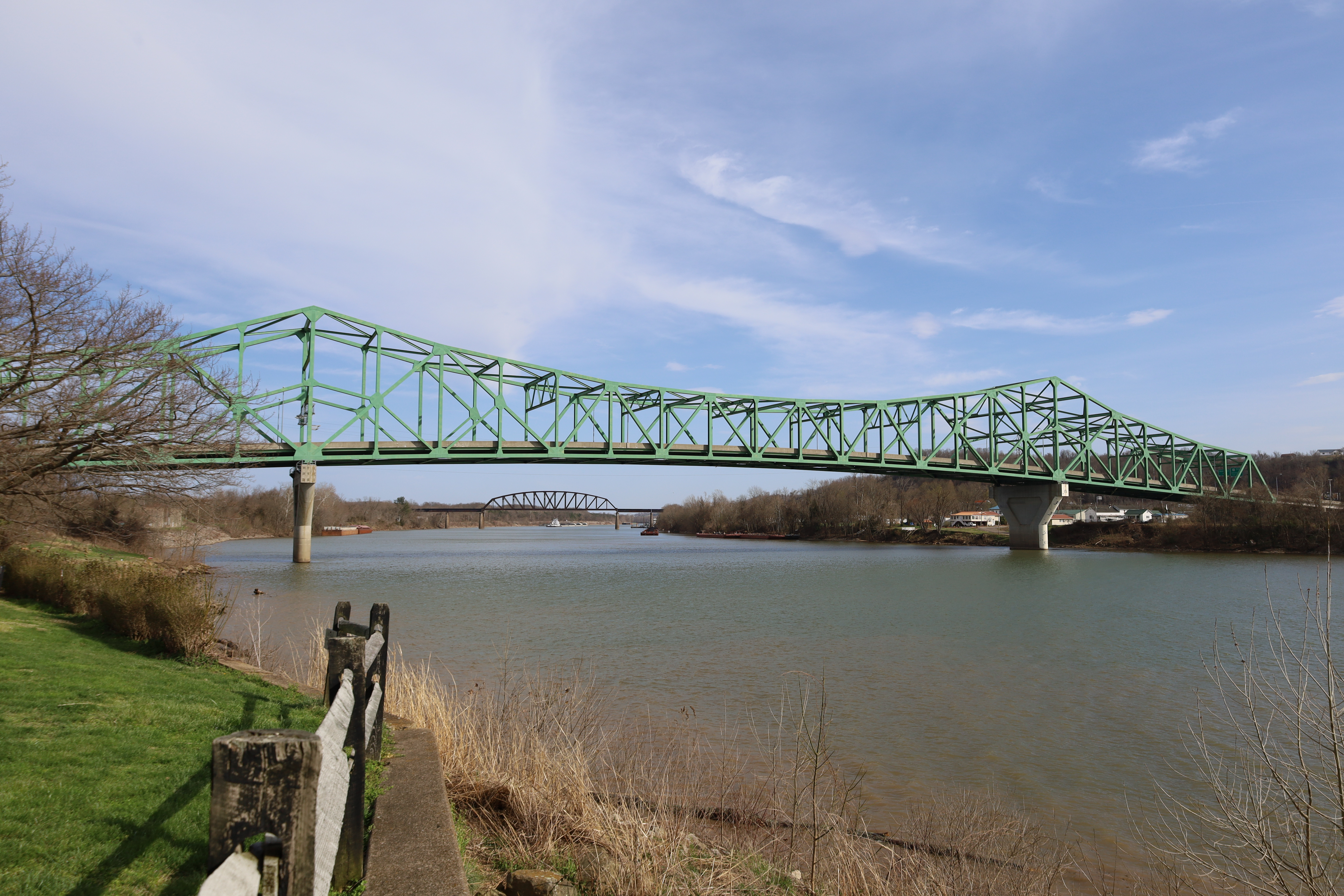
WV 2 crosses the Kanawha River over the Bartow Jones Bridge at Point Pleasant, West Virginia

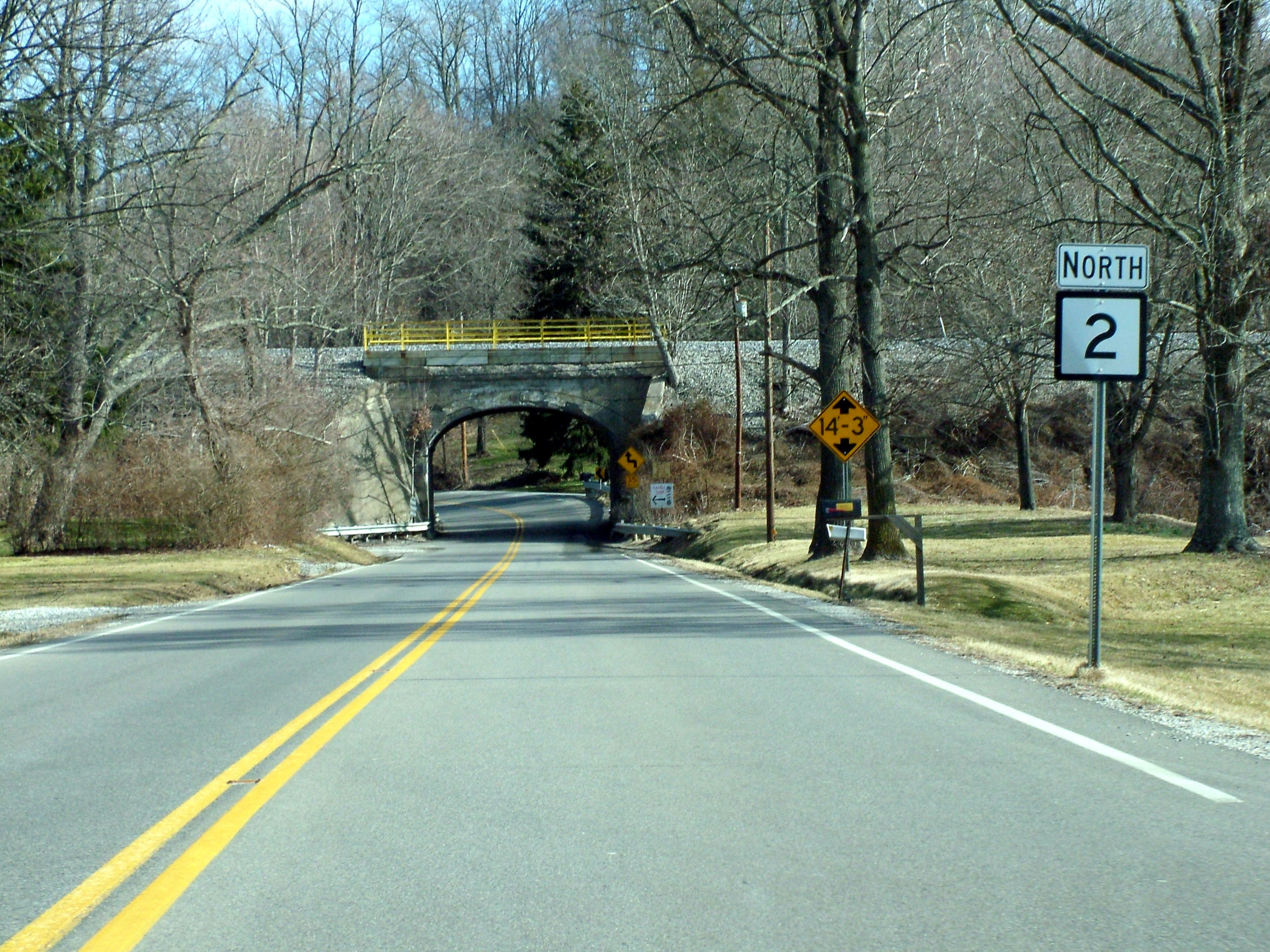
1909 stone masonry rail bridge crossing WV-2 near Point Pleasant

WV 2 was reconstructed from Lesage to Glenwood as an improved two-lane highway with shoulders on a four-lane right-of-way in the mid-1980s.

=== Parkersburg to Wheeling ===
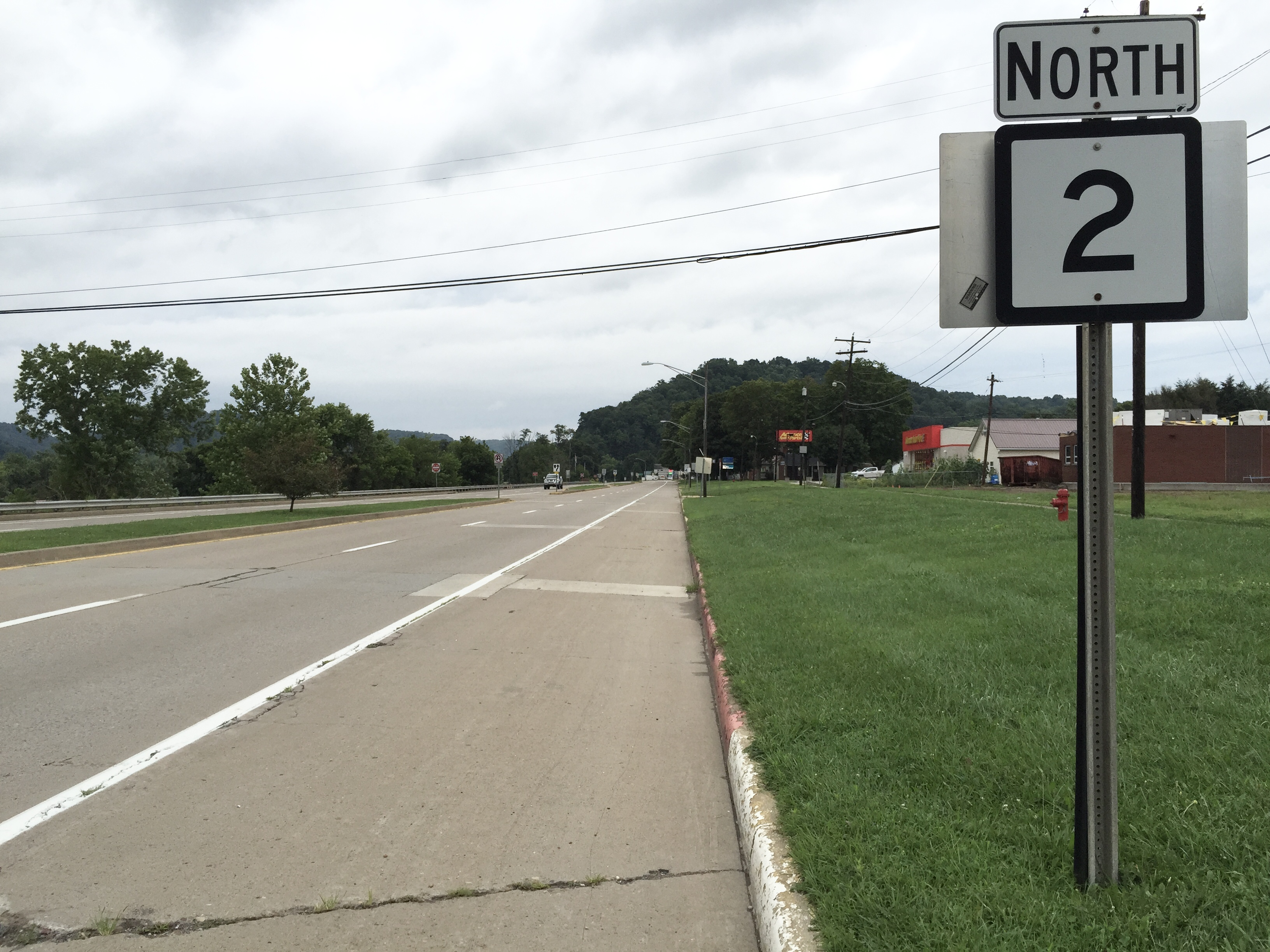
View north along WV 2 at WV 16 in St. Marys

WV 2 follows the Ohio River from Parkersburg to Wheeling. Portions have been upgraded to four and five lanes, with eventual plans to upgrade the entire corridor.

=== Wheeling to Chester ===
WV 2 is a variable two-lane and four-lane highway from Wheeling to its northern terminus at Chester.

For a time, Route 2 deviated from its current alignment to follow a more northeasterly route from New Cumberland to US 30 via the unincorporated area of New Manchester. The current alignment of WV 2 passing the Mountaineer Race Track and Gaming Resort to US 30 was formerly numbered WV 66 and is reflected as such in many of the county highways in the area. The former routing of WV 2 is now WV 8.

On June 23, 2000, work began on a project that widened WV 2 from two to four lanes from Weirton at US 22 (Robert C. Byrd Expressway) south to CR 8 near Follansbee. The project length was just 0.9 miles. Work was supposed to be complete by June 2001, however, construction wrapped up on October 31 at a cost of $21,444,875. The project entailed stabilizing the hillside by reshaping the highwall, widening the roadway with four 12-foot (3.7 m) lanes, creating 10-foot (3.0 m) outside shoulders, and 8-foot (2.4 m) interior shoulders. 3.9 million cubic yards of earth were removed during the excavation process.

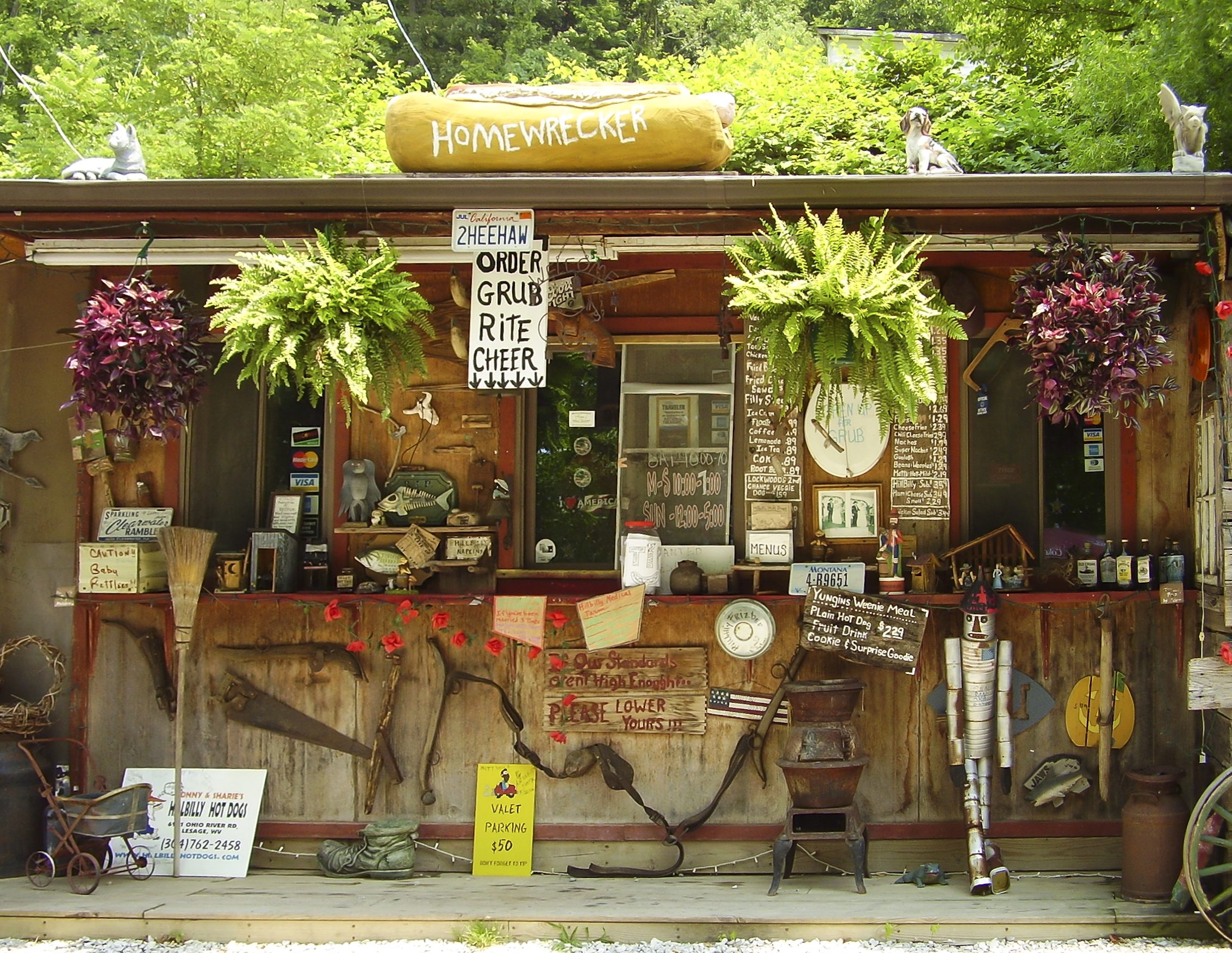
A roadside hot dog stand, Hillbilly Hot Dogs, located along WV 2 in Lesage.

One year later, the highway widening project progressed further south for 2.5 miles (4.0 km).

== Notes ==
- The state route is the subject of Driving Up the Ohio River on Route 2 in Late Fall, a poem by Larry Smith. The poem was featured on the October 26, 2006 edition of The Writer's Almanac radio program.

== Major intersections ==
County	Location	mi	km	Destinations	Notes
Cabell	Huntington	0.0	0.0	US 60 to I-64 – Downtown Huntington, Proctorville	Southern terminus of WV 2
Cabell				WV 193 south to I-64 / US 60 – Barboursville	Northern terminus of WV 193
Mason	Henderson			US 35 – Chillicothe, Ohio, Charleston	Interchange
Mason	Henderson–Point Pleasant line			Bartow Jones Bridge over Kanawha River	
Mason	Point Pleasant			To Viand Street north / WV 62 – Point Pleasant, Mason	
Mason	Point Pleasant			WV 62 north – Mason	Southern terminus of first WV 62 concurrency
Mason				WV 62 south – Buffalo	Northern terminus of first WV 62 concurrency
Mason				WV 87 east – Evans	Western terminus of WV 87
Jackson	Mount Alto			WV 62 south / WV 331 east – New Haven, Cottageville	Southern terminus of second WV 62 concurrency
Jackson				WV 62 north – Ripley	Northern terminus of second WV 62 concurrency
Jackson	Ravenswood			US 33 west / WV 68 north – Ravenswood, Columbus, OH	Southern terminus of US 33 concurrency
Jackson	Silverton			I-77 south / US 33 east / CR 56 east (Green Hills Road) – Ripley, Charleston	Northern terminus of US 33 concurrency; southern terminus of I-77 concurrency; WV 2 south follows exit 146
see I-77
Wood				I-77 north / WV 68 south (Emerson Avenue) – Marietta, OH, Vienna, Ohio Valley University	Northern terminus of I-77 concurrency; WV 2 north follows exit 179
Wood				WV 31 south – Deerwalk	Southern terminus of WV 31 concurrency
Wood				WV 31 north – MOV Regional Airport, Williamstown	Northern terminus of WV 31 concurrency
Pleasants				To SR 7 / Carpenter Memorial Bridge (WV 807) – Newport, OH	
Pleasants	St. Marys			WV 16 south – Ellenboro, Pleasants County Park	Northern terminus of WV 16
Tyler	Sistersville			WV 18 south – Middlebourne	Northern terminus of WV 18
Tyler	Sistersville			Charles Street – Sistersville Ferry	
Wetzel				WV 180 south – Middlebourne	Northern terminus of WV 180
Wetzel	New Martinsville			WV 7 east to WV 20	Southern terminus of WV 7 concurrency
Wetzel	New Martinsville			SR 7 / New Martinsville Bridge (WV 7 west) – Ohio	Interchange; northern terminus of WV 7 concurrency
Wetzel	Proctor			CR 89	Western terminus of CR 89; formerly WV 89
Marshall				WV 2 Alt. north (Round Bottom Hill Road)	Southern terminus of Alternate WV 2
Marshall				WV 2 Alt. south / CR 21 (Roberts Ridge Road) – Airport	Northern terminus of Alternate WV 2
Marshall	Moundsville			To 12th Street / Moundsville Bridge (WV 2 Spur) / SR 7 – Bellaire, OH, Powhatan Point, OH	
Marshall	Moundsville			US 250 south – Central Business District, Cameron, Grand Vue Park	Southern terminus of US 250 concurrency; southbound exit and northbound entrance
Marshall	Moundsville			To 7th Street south / US 250 – Grand Vue Park	
Marshall	Glen Dale			WV 86 north	Southern terminus of WV 86
Marshall	McMechen			East Baltimore Street – McMechen	Northbound exit only
Marshall	McMechen			12th Street – McMechen	
Marshall	McMechen			3rd Street – McMechen	Northbound access only; Southern terminus of freeway
Marshall	Benwood			South Marshall Street – Benwood, McMechen	
Marshall	Benwood			Bellaire Bridge	Former interchange
Marshall	Benwood			4th Street – Benwood	
Marshall	Benwood			CR 1 (Boggs Run Road)	
Ohio	Wheeling			I-470 / 26th Street	I-470 exit 1
Ohio	Wheeling			US 250 north to I-70 – Columbus, Washington	Interchange; northbound exit and southbound entrance; northern terminus of US 250 concurrency; northern terminus of freeway
Ohio	Wheeling			10th Street (Wheeling Suspension Bridge)	
Ohio	Wheeling			I-70 / US 40 west – Columbus, Washington	Southern terminus of US 40 concurrency; I-70 exit 1A
Ohio	Wheeling			US 40 east (National Road) to I-70 east	Northern terminus of US 40 concurrency
Brooke	Wellsburg			WV 67 east – Bethany, West Liberty University, Bethany College	Western terminus of WV 67
Brooke	Wellsburg			WV 27 east (10th Street)	Western terminus of WV 27
Brooke	Follansbee			WV 27 Alt. east	Western terminus of Alternate WV 27
Brooke				Market Street Bridge – Steubenville	
Brooke				US 22 west – Steubenville, Ohio	Interchange; southern terminus of US 22 concurrency; WV 2 south follows exit 1
Brooke	Weirton Junction			US 22 east – Pittsburgh	Interchange; northern terminus of US 22 concurrency; WV 2 north follows exit 2
Hancock	Weirton			CR 507 west (Freedom Way)	Western terminus of CR 507 concurrency
Hancock	Weirton			CR 507 east (Cove Road)	Eastern terminus of CR 507 concurrency
Hancock	Weirton			WV 105 east (Penn Avenue)	Western terminus of WV 105
Hancock	New Cumberland			WV 8 north – New Manchester	Southern terminus of WV 8
Hancock	Newell			Wayne Six Toll Bridge	
Hancock	Chester	230.6	371.1	US 30 – East Liverpool, Pittsburgh	Interchange; northern terminus of WV 2
1.000 mi = 1.609 km; 1.000 km = 0.621 mi: Closed/former; Concurrency terminus
