= Fort Henry Bridge =

Bridge crossing the Ohio River in West Virginia

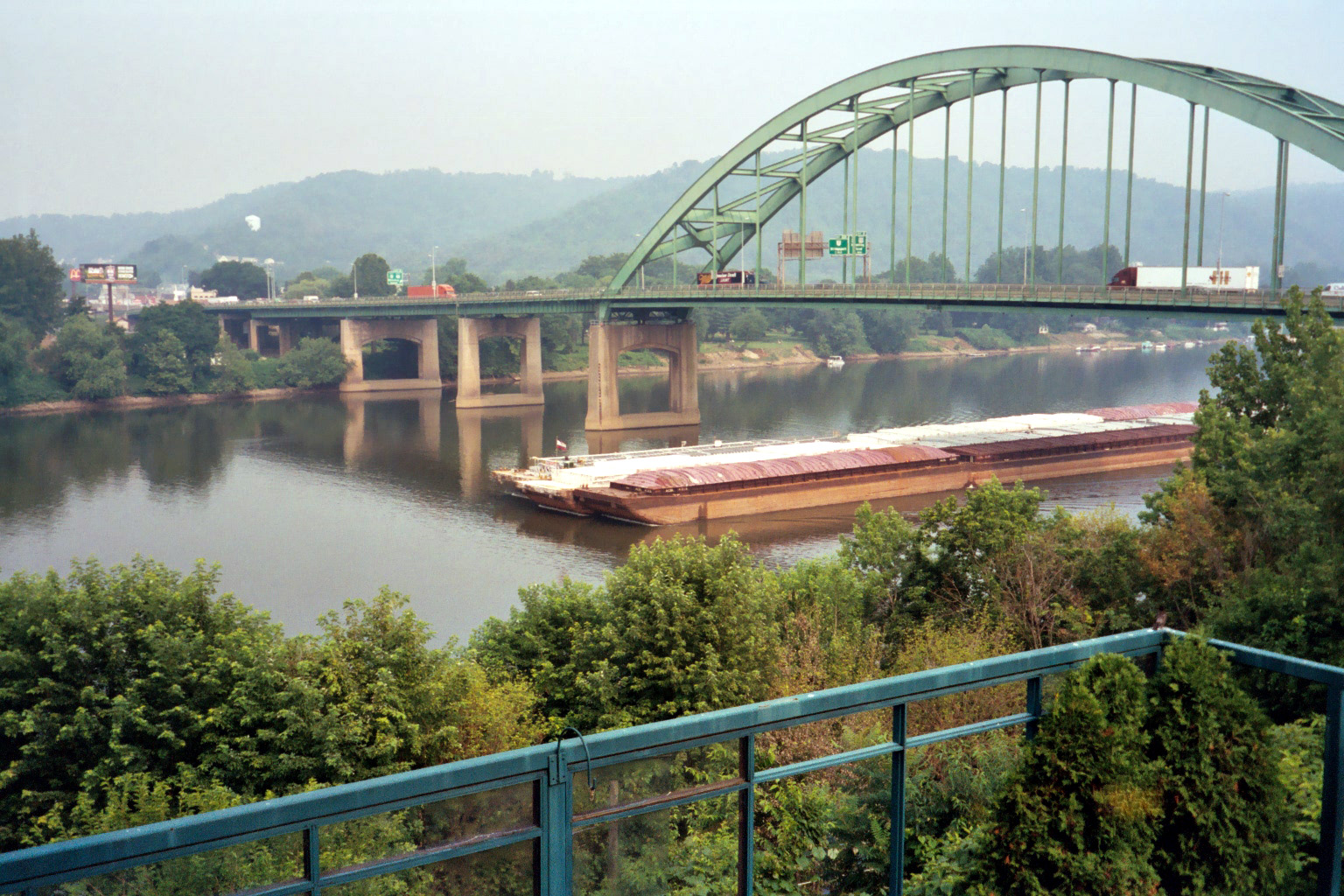
- Looking towards Wheeling Island on the Fort Henry Bridge
- Coordinates: 40°04′19″N 80°43′39″W
- Carries: I-70 / US 40 / US 250
- Crosses: Ohio River main channel
- Locale: Wheeling, West Virginia
- Maintained by: West Virginia Department of Transportation
- ID number: 00000000035A061

Characteristics
- Design: Tied arch bridge
- Total length: 1,660 feet (506 m)
- Width: 53.5 feet (16 m)
- Longest span: 580 feet (176.8 m)

History
- Opened: September 8, 1955

Statistics
- Daily traffic: 60,070 (2009)

Location
- Interactive map of Fort Henry Bridge

The Fort Henry Bridge is a crossing of the Ohio River main channel in Wheeling, West Virginia. The tied-arch bridge carries two lanes in each direction of Interstate 70 (I-70), U.S. Route 40 (US 40), and US 250. The bridge opened after four years of construction work on September 8, 1955, costing $6.8 million, $1.8 million over budget. The bridge, along with the aging Wheeling Suspension Bridge, are the only two road links from Wheeling Island to downtown Wheeling, although this is the only one that allows vehicular traffic. In 2009, the structure carried an average of over 60,000 vehicles per day.

== Description ==
The long tied-arch bridge carries four lanes of concurrent highways I-70, US 40 and US 250 over the main channel of the Ohio River between Wheeling Island and downtown Wheeling, West Virginia. The bridge is the easternmost portion of a 1-mile (1.6 km) long chain of elevated structures spanning Wheeling Creek in Ohio, the Ohio River back channel, Wheeling Island, and the main channel. To the east of the bridge after an interchange in downtown Wheeling, I-70 and US 250 enter the Wheeling Tunnel. Besides the Wheeling Suspension Bridge, the Fort Henry Bridge is the only fixed connection from Wheeling Island to mainland West Virginia. The bridge is named after Fort Henry, which in turn was named after Patrick Henry, the governor of Virginia Territory at the outbreak of the American Revolutionary War.

Truck traffic is prohibited from using the Wheeling Suspension Bridge and must take the Fort Henry Bridge to cross between downtown Wheeling and Wheeling Island. The bridge is owned and maintained by the State of West Virginia. Every year, the West Virginia Department of Transportation (WVDOT) conducts a series of surveys on its highways in the state to measure traffic volume. This is expressed in terms of average annual daily traffic (AADT), which is a measure of traffic volume for any average day of the year. In 2009, WVDOT calculated that 60,070 vehicles used the Fort Henry Bridge over the main channel of the Ohio River. This represents a 334 percent increase in traffic from 1956, the first year traffic data was published, when 18,000 vehicles used the bridge.

== History ==
Contracts to build the Fort Henry Bridge were let to the American Bridge Company, a subsidiary of U.S. Steel, and Dravo Corporation of Pittsburgh, Pennsylvania. Costing $6.8 million, $1.8 million over budget, and taking four years to complete, the Fort Henry Bridge opened to traffic on September 8, 1955 after a ribbon-cutting ceremony with then-governor William C. Marland in front of a crowd of 55,000 to 60,000 people. The bridge earned an Honorable Mention in 1955 from the National Steel Bridge Alliance, a part of the American Institute of Steel Construction, which recognizes the best steel bridges of the year. At the time of construction, the bridge was only the second tied-arch bridge across the Ohio River.

The bridge was originally named the Ninth Street Bridge, and was designed to relieve traffic on the National Road's Wheeling Suspension Bridge. The roadway as originally opened carried four lanes with a 4 ft (1.2 m) median between each direction. During the first years of the bridge it carried US 40 and US 250 from Wheeling Island over the Ohio River main channel. In 1957 plans to add an Interstate Highway designation to the bridge were formed, with the Interstate 70 designation added by 1966. The bridge underwent a renovation in 1990 which included replacement of its bridge deck.

The bridge, along with the Vietnam Veterans Memorial Bridge and the Wheeling Suspension bridge were all closed in January 2005, stopping any traffic from Ohio or Wheeling Island from entering mainland West Virginia for an hour due to barges breaking loose during heavy flooding along the Ohio River.

== See also ==
- List of crossings of the Ohio River
- Interstate 470 Bridge, another tied arch bridge across the Ohio River at Wheeling
