= West Virginia Route 891 =

State highway in Marshall County, West Virginia, United States

West Virginia Route 891
- WV 891 highlighted in red

Route information
- Maintained by WVDOH
- Length: 2.29 mi (3.69 km)
- Existed: 1980s–present

Major junctions
- West end: US 250 north of Cameron
- East end: PA 21 in Rocklick

Location
- Country: United States
- State: West Virginia
- Counties: Marshall

Highway system
- West Virginia State Highway System; Interstate; US; State
| ← WV 869 | → WV 892 |

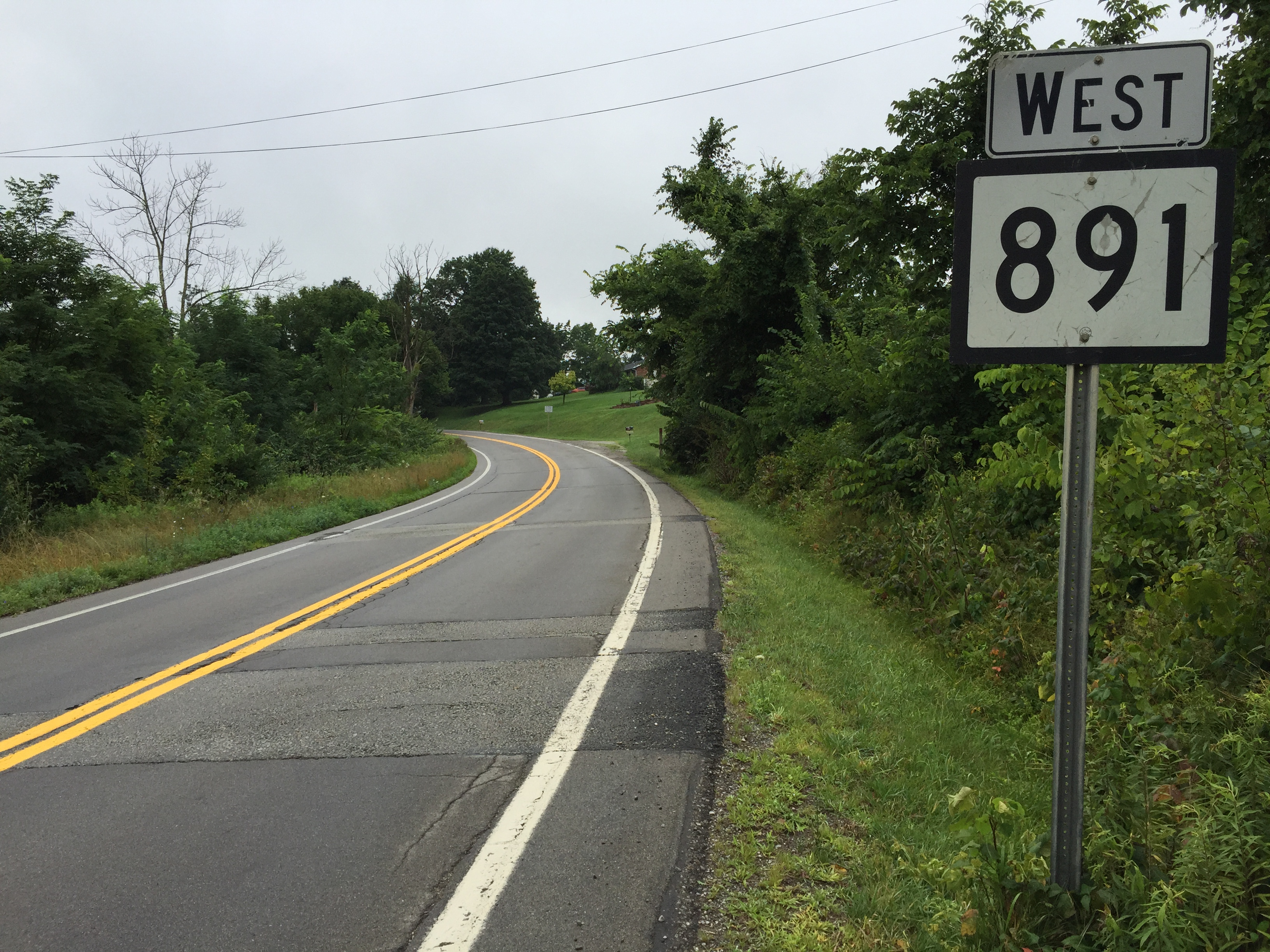
View west at the east end of WV 891 at PA 21 at the Pennsylvania border northeast of Cameron

West Virginia Route 891 is a 2.29-mile (3.69 km) long east–west state highway located in Marshall County, West Virginia. The western terminus of the route is at U.S. Route 250 roughly three miles north of Cameron. The eastern terminus is at the Pennsylvania state line, where WV 891 continues east as Pennsylvania Route 21.

== Route description ==
WV 891 begins at an intersection with US 250 north of Cameron and heads east. The very curvy route mainly serves as a connector to Pennsylvania Route 21, as the highway intersects no other state highways and doesn't run through any communities.

== History ==
Until the late 1980s, the route was known as West Virginia Route 89. WV 89 continued west along present County Route 89 to WV 2 at Proctor.

== Major intersections ==
The entire route is in Marshall County.

| Location | mi | km | Destinations | Notes |
|---|---|---|---|---|
| | 0.00 | 0.00 | US 250 – Cameron, Moundsville | |
| | 2.29 | 3.69 | PA 21 east – Waynesburg | |
1.000 mi = 1.609 km; 1.000 km = 0.621 mi
