= Bridgeport Bridge (Ohio River) =

Military Order of the Purple Heart Bridge
- Coordinates: 40.072352°N 80.738345°W
- Carries: US 40 / US 250
- Crosses: Ohio River back channel
- Locale: Bridgeport, Ohio to Wheeling Island, West Virginia
- Maintained by: West Virginia Department of Transportation
- ID number: 00000000035A133

Characteristics
- Design: Girder bridge
- Total length: 196 meters (643 ft)
- Width: 12.2 meters (40 ft)
- No. of spans: 1

History
- Construction end: 1998

The Military Order of the Purple Heart Bridge, named after the Military Order of the Purple Heart, carries U.S. Route 40 and US 250 over the Ohio River back channel between Wheeling Island, West Virginia and Bridgeport, Ohio. Construction began in 1995 and finished in 1998.

The bridge was built to replace the adjacent Bridgeport Bridge which had fallen into disrepair.

== History ==
Bridgeport Bridge
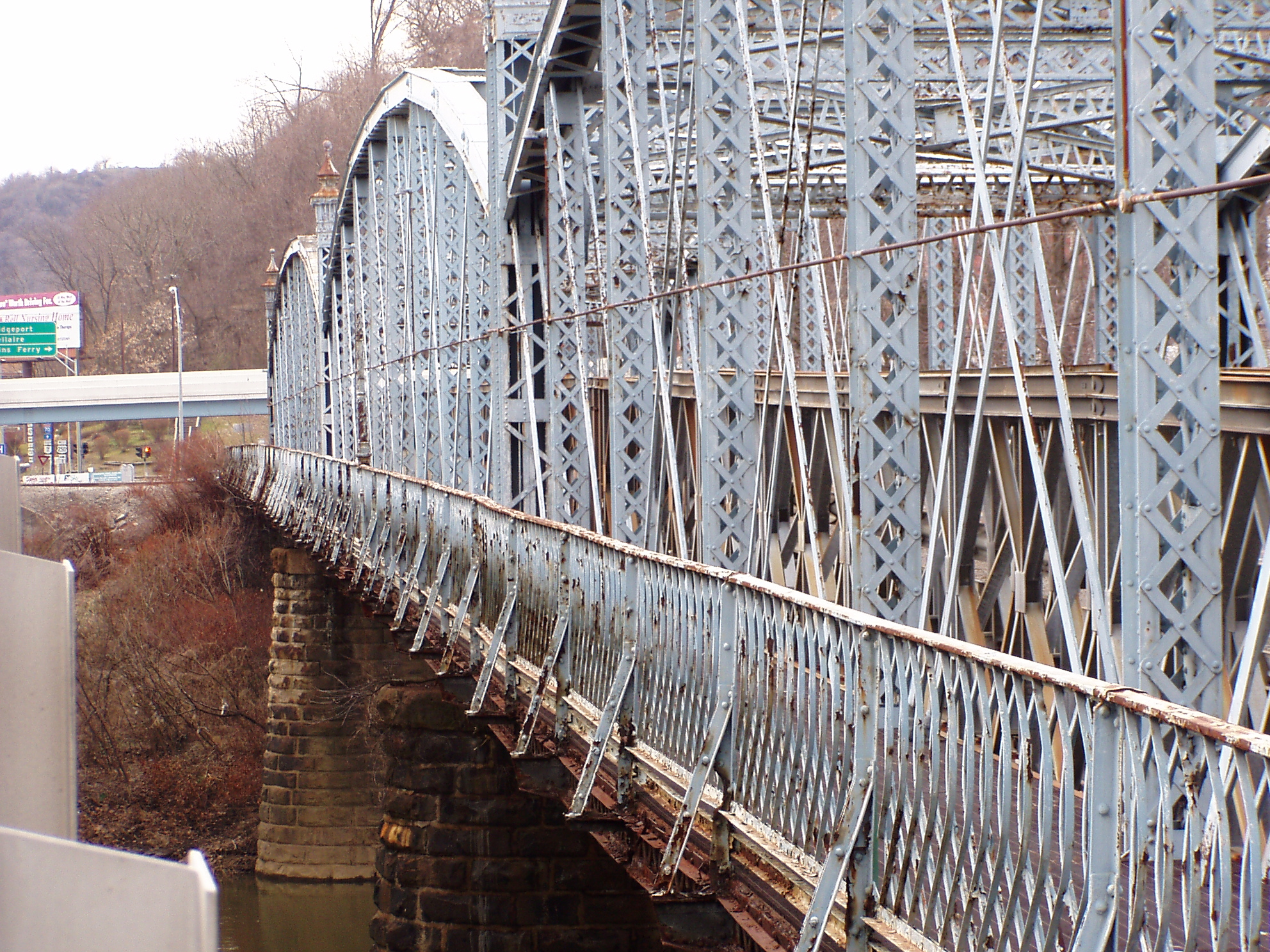
- Bridge after closure
- Coordinates: 40°04′21″N 80°44′19″W
- Carries: US 40
- Crosses: Ohio River
- Locale: Wheeling Island, West Virginia
- Official name: Wheeling and Belmont Bridge
- Heritage status: Historic American Engineering Record
- Followed by: Military Order of the Purple Heart Bridge

Characteristics
- Material: Steel(1950-1987) wood (1893-1950)

History
- Construction end: 1893 (original span); 1998 (current span)
- Closed: 1998 (Bridgeport Bridge)
- Replaces: Wooden covered bridge

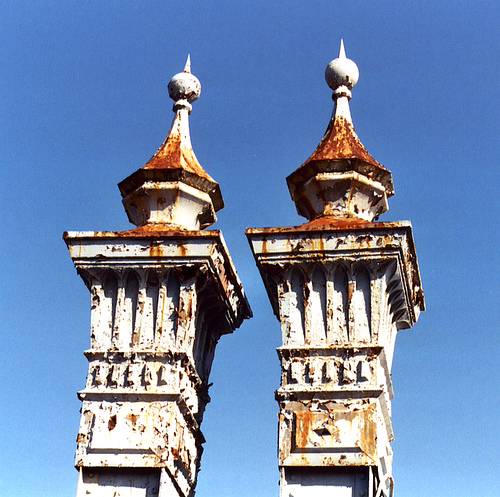
Finials atop the former bridge

The Bridgeport Bridge (known officially as the Wheeling and Belmont bridge as per the dedication plaque affixed to the original structure) was a steel-framed bridge but was built with a wooden deck in 1893 to replace a prior wooden covered bridge that was built on the same site circa 1836. In fact, the 1893 bridge was partially built off of the old bridge, as it utilized the same piers that were built for the earlier bridge. The primary reason for construction of the new bridge was to accommodate the new electric streetcars that were being deployed in Wheeling. With the construction of the Steel Bridge across the main channel of the Ohio River from Wheeling Island to the City of Wheeling circa 1889, electric streetcar service was expanded into Ohio, eventually stretching all the way west to the small mining town of Barton, which is approximately 15 miles (24 km) west of Wheeling. The original bridge's traffic moved to the current bridge in 1998. Despite this, the original bridge was not demolished until 2011.

The original bridge was documented by the Historic American Engineering Record program, which provided the following description of its significance in approximately 1987:

Built in 1893, the Bridgeport Bridge represented one type of bridges which could be ordered from catalogues at the end of the nineteenth century. Except for the replacement of the partially wooden roadway surface with steel grating in 1950, the bridge remained basically unchanged. Because the floor beams had become structurally unsound, a new, self-supporting, load-bearing deck structure was installed inside the trusses of the Bridgeport Bridge in 1987. Designed as a temporary means of carrying traffic until the current bridge span was built, the deck installed was prefabricated in England and is a modern-day successor to the Bailey bridge type.

In 1987 or so, there were plans for the building of a replacement vehicular bridge nearby, upstream. It was expected that the original Bridgeport bridge would remain as a pedestrian and bicycle bridge.

The wooden deck of the original bridge was replaced in 1950 with steel grating, and the streetcar tracks were removed, as interurban rail service was discontinued in 1948. By 1987, the floor beams had become structurally unsound for automobile traffic due to extensive corrosion. A self-supporting, load-bearing deck structure, known as a Bailey Truss, was installed inside the trusses of the Bridgeport Bridge. Despite this, this was not designed for rehabilitation, and the current bridge was opened in 1998 with the current Military Order of the Purple Heart Bridge. Sometime in 2009 much of the Bailey Truss was removed. It is unclear if the steel grate floor had been removed prior to the installation of the Bailey Truss, but after the removal of its floor structure the former Bridgeport Bridge was left without a floor.

In 2009, it was announced that the former bridge would be demolished, and the cost of demolishing the bridge was estimated to be less than $200,000. (about $284,055 in 2024)

Early in the summer of 2011, WTOV-TV in Steubenville reported that the original bridge was to be demolished, with demolition tentatively scheduled to start at the end of July 2011. They reported that the West Virginia Division of Highways received a request from the U.S. Coast Guard to bring the bridge down as it was a safety hazard and pieces had fallen into the river. It also verified that many of the unique features of the bridge, such as the railings, signage, the finials on top, and plaques would be removed prior to demolition. The bridge demolition was expected to take 60 days and cost $750,000.00, which was considerably less than a $1.2 million estimate for demolition costs that had been given in 2000.

Explosive demolition of the original bridge occurred on Monday, September 12, 2011. Explosive charges were used to drop the bridge into the river, after which cranes began retrieving the steel parts for scrapping. Complete removal of bridge and piers was scheduled to be completed by end of October 2011.

== See also ==
- List of bridges documented by the Historic American Engineering Record in Ohio
- List of bridges documented by the Historic American Engineering Record in West Virginia
- List of crossings of the Ohio River
