= Wheeling Island =

Island in West Virginia, United States

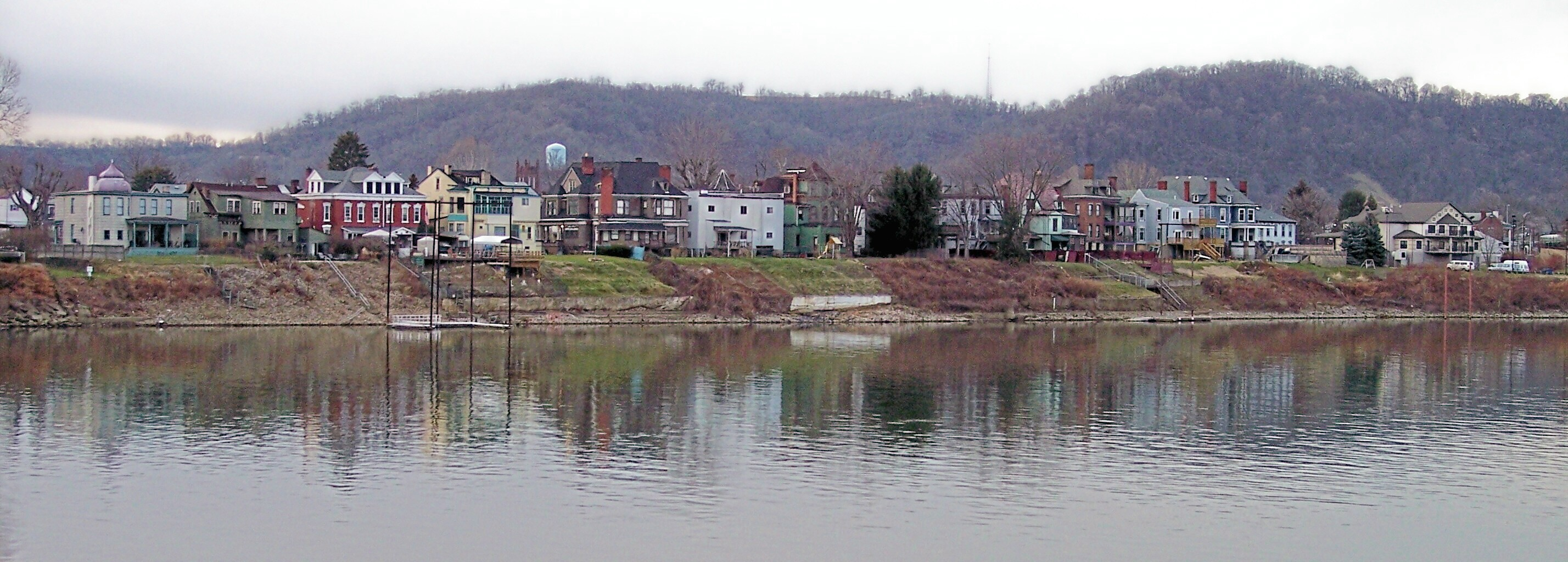
- Buildings on Wheeling Island as viewed across the east channel of the Ohio River from downtown Wheeling in 2006. The hills in the background are in Belmont County, Ohio.

- Location within West Virginia Location within the United States

Geography
- Location: Ohio River
- Coordinates: 40°04′14″N 80°43′59″W

Administration
- United States
- West Virginia
- Ohio County

Demographics
- Population: 3,142 (2000)

Additional information
- Time zone: Eastern

Wheeling Island is the most populated island in the Ohio River. It lies within the city of Wheeling in Ohio County, West Virginia, United States. The 2000 census showed a resident population of 3,142 people on the island, which has a land area of 1.514 square kilometers (374 acres). Neville Island, Pennsylvania, is larger (3.4 square kilometers; 840 acres) but has fewer people (1,232).

Wheeling Island lies at the mouths of Wheeling Creek of Ohio and Wheeling Creek of West Virginia. The island is home to the Wheeling Island Hotel-Casino-Racetrack at Wheeling Downs and Wheeling Island Stadium, home of the West Virginia State Football Championships.

Wheeling Island has a number of historic homes featuring Victorian Architecture. An elementary school (Madison Elementary, by Prominent WV Architect F.F. Faris, also Wheeling Island is the location of his personal residence), churches, a public pool (Bridge Park Pool), and several restaurants are located on the island.

A section of Wheeling Island is protected as part of the Ohio River Islands National Wildlife Refuge.

== Transportation ==
Wheeling Island is connected to downtown Wheeling via the Fort Henry Bridge, carrying Interstate 70, U.S. Route 40, and U.S. Route 250, and the Wheeling Suspension Bridge, carrying the National Road.

Two additional bridges cross the back channel of the Ohio River to connect the island to Bridgeport, one for Interstate 70, and a second for US 250 and US 40. The Aetnaville Bridge also crosses the back channel of the Ohio River, but was closed to vehicle traffic in 1988 and to the public in 2016 over safety concerns.

== Variant names ==
Originally known by various names including Zanes Island and Madison Island, the Board on Geographic Names decided upon Wheeling Island as the bar's official name in 1902. Local residents refer to it as simply "The Island."

== See also ==
- List of islands of West Virginia
- Harry C. and Jessie F. Franzheim House
- John McLure House
