= U.S. Route 40 in West Virginia =

Highway in West Virginia

U.S. Route 40
- US 40 highlighted in red

Route information
- Maintained by WVDOH
- Length: 16.0 mi (25.7 km)

Major junctions
- West end: US 40 / US 250 at the Ohio state line in Wheeling
- I-70 in Wheeling; WV 2 in Wheeling; WV 88 in Wheeling
- East end: US 40 at the Pennsylvania state line in Mount Echo

Location
- Country: United States
- State: West Virginia
- Counties: Ohio

Highway system
- United States Numbered Highway System; List; Special; Divided; West Virginia State Highway System; Interstate; US; State
← WV 39	→ WV 41

In the U.S. state of West Virginia, U.S. Route 40 (US 40) runs for 16 miles (26 km) through the Northern Panhandle region. The highway enters the state on the Military Order of the Purple Heart bridge concurrent with US 250, crossing Wheeling Island, before joining Interstate 70 (I-70) over the Fort Henry Bridge before leaving the interstate. The highway travels north around Wheeling Hill, before traveling through the northeastern suburbs of Wheeling, Triadelphia and Valley Grove before entering Pennsylvania. A majority of the route still follows the old National Road which predates the U.S. Highway System.

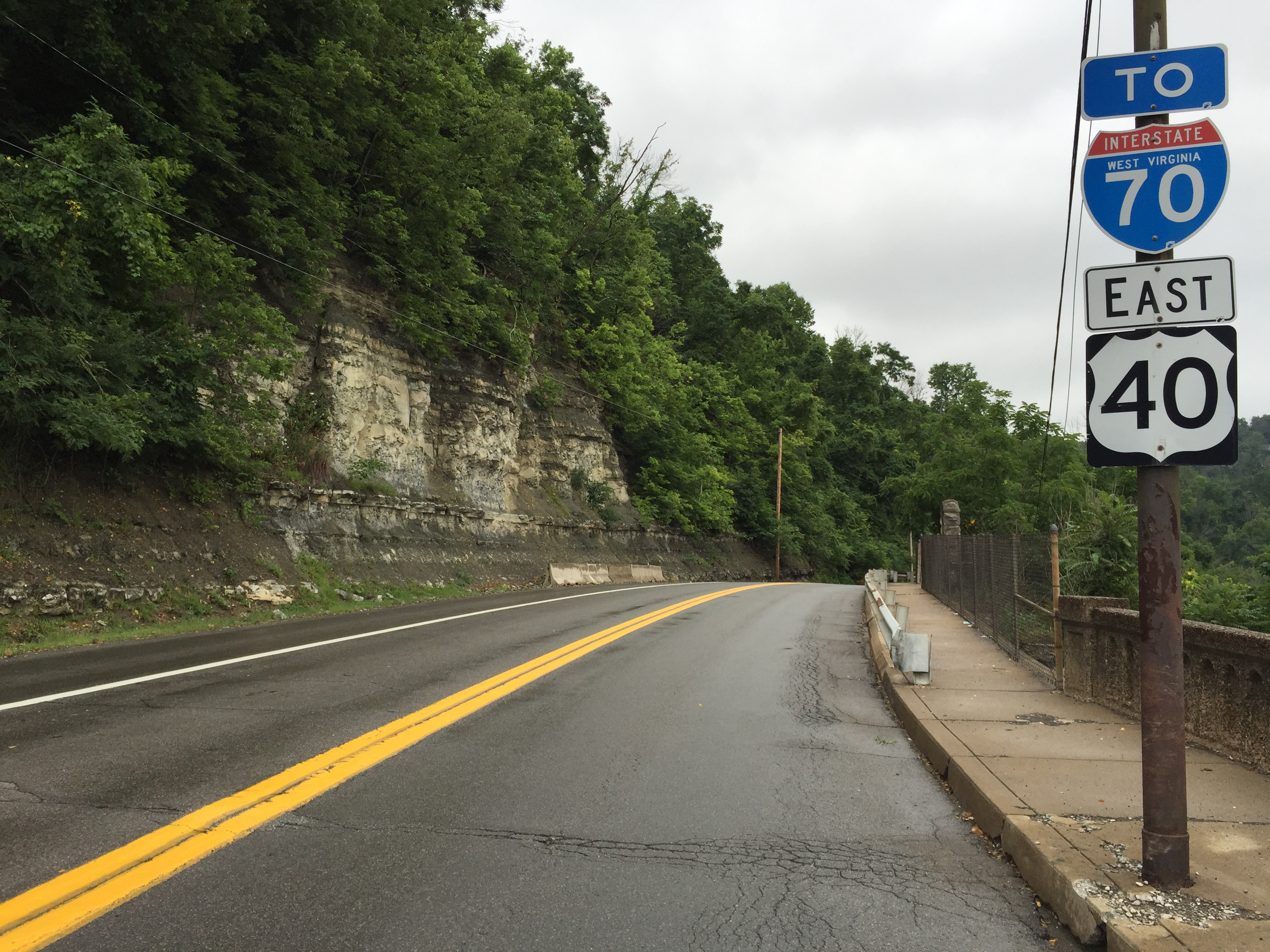
View east along US 40 in Wheeling

== History ==
Before the construction of I-70, US 40 continued southeast along Zane Street to Virginia Street, crossing the east channel of the Ohio River on the Wheeling Suspension Bridge.

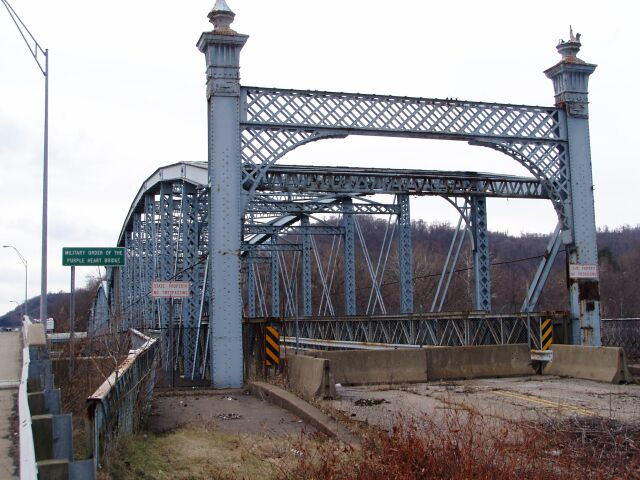
Old U.S. 40 Bridge between Wheeling Island and the Ohio shore

== Major intersections ==
The entire route is in Ohio County.

Location	mi	km	Destinations	Notes
Wheeling (Wheeling Island)			US 40 west / US 250 west / Historic National Road west – Bridgeport	Ohio state line (Military Order of the Purple Heart Bridge over Ohio River back channel)
Wheeling (Wheeling Island)	0.35	0.56	I-70 west – Columbus, OH	Western end of I-70 concurrency; westbound exit and eastbound entrance; US 40 west follows exit 0
Wheeling	0.63	1.01	Fort Henry Bridge over Ohio River	
Wheeling	0.79	1.27	I-70 east / US 250 south / WV 2 south / 10th Street (Wheeling Suspension Bridge) – Washington, PA	Eastern end of I-70 / US 250 concurrency, western end of WV 2 concurrency; US 40 east follows exit 1A
Wheeling			WV 2 north (Main Street) – Weirton, Airport	Eastern end of WV 2 concurrency
Wheeling			I-70 – Washington, PA, Columbus, OH	I-70 exit 2A
Wheeling			WV 88 north (Bethany Pike) – Oglebay Park	Western end of WV 88 concurrency
Wheeling			I-70 west – Columbus	I-70 exit 4
Wheeling			WV 88 south (Bethlehem Boulevard) – Bethlehem	Eastern end of WV 88 concurrency
Wheeling			I-70 to I-470 west – Columbus, Washington, PA	I-70 exit 5
Triadelphia			CR 39 (Middle Creek Road)	
Roneys Point			CR 27 (Point Run Road) / CR 41 (Dallas Pike)	
Valley Grove			CR 35 (McGraws Run Road)	
			CR 45 (Atkinson Crossing Road)	
			Historic National Road east / CR 40/10 (Old US 40)	east end of National Road overlap
			US 40 east	Pennsylvania state line
1.000 mi = 1.609 km; 1.000 km = 0.621 mi: Concurrency terminus; Incomplete access

== See also ==
- Wheeling Suspension Bridge
- Wheeling, West Virginia

U.S. Route 40
Previous state: Ohio	West Virginia	Next state: Pennsylvania
