= Roaring Creek (Tygart Valley River tributary) =

Stream in Randolph County, West Virginia, U.S.

Coordinates: 38°56′11″N 79°57′03″W

Roaring Creek is a stream in Randolph County in the U.S. state of West Virginia. It is a tributary of the Tygart Valley, Monongahela, Ohio, and Mississippi Rivers. It rises on the western slopes of Rich Mountain and flows for approximately 13 miles to join the Tygart about 2 miles downstream of Aggregates and 4 miles downstream of Elkins.

Roaring Creek was descriptively named on account of its audibly turbulent waters. At suitable water levels the 5 miles from Coalton to the confluence with the Tygart is a class III to V whitewater run.

== See also ==
- List of rivers of West Virginia
