= Thornwood, West Virginia =

- Unincorporated community
- Location within West Virginia Location within the United States
- Coordinates: 38°33′30″N 79°44′13″W
- Country: United States
- State: West Virginia
- County: Pocahontas
- Incorporated: 1912
- Elevation: 2,884 ft (879 m)
- Time zone: UTC-5 (Eastern (EST))
  - Summer (DST): UTC-4 (EDT)
- Area codes: 304 & 681
- GNIS feature ID: 1555805

Thornwood is an unincorporated community in Pocahontas County, West Virginia, United States. Thornwood is on the East Fork of the Greenbrier River. US Route 250 passes approximately one-half mile to the south. It is approximately 5 miles (8.0 km) east-northeast of Durbin.

Thornwood was incorporated in 1912.
