= Aggregates, West Virginia =

Unincorporated community in West Virginia, United States

- Unincorporated community
- Location within West Virginia Location within the United States
- Coordinates: 38°56′10″N 79°55′07″W
- Country: United States
- State: West Virginia
- County: Randolph
- Elevation: 1,933 ft (589 m)

Population (2000)
  - Total: 32
- Time zone: UTC-5 (Eastern (EST))
  - Summer (DST): UTC-4 (EDT)
- GNIS ID: 1553702

Aggregates is an unincorporated community in Randolph County, West Virginia, USA. It is situated on the Tygart Valley River about 2 miles above its confluence with Roaring Creek and about 2 miles below Elkins.
