= Proctor, West Virginia =

Proctor
- Unincorporated community
- Location within the state of West Virginia Proctor (the United States)
- Coordinates: 39°42′42″N 80°49′25″W
- Country: United States
- State: West Virginia
- County: Marshall
- Time zone: UTC-5 (Eastern (EST))
  - Summer (DST): UTC-4 (EDT)
- ZIP codes: 26055

Proctor (also referred to as Austinville or Proctors) is an unincorporated community in northwestern Wetzel County, West Virginia, United States. It lies on West Virginia Route 2 along the Ohio River, north of the city of New Martinsville, the county seat of Wetzel County. Its elevation is 630 feet (192 m). Because the community has borne multiple names, the Board on Geographic Names officially designated it "Proctor" in 1980. It has a post office with the ZIP code 26055.

The community was named after a pioneer settler named Proctor.

== See also ==
- List of cities and towns along the Ohio River
