= The Highlands (Wheeling, West Virginia) =

Coordinates: 40°03′25″N 80°36′04″W

- Location: Triadelphia, West Virginia
- Opened: 2004
- Developer: Ohio County Development Authority
- Manager: Ohio County Development Authority
- Owner: Ohio County Development Authority
- Num. of stores: 100+
- Num. of anchor tenants: 12
- Floor area: 1,400,000 square feet (130,000 m^{2})
- Floors: 1
- Website: The Highlands

The Highlands is a retail park in Triadelphia, West Virginia, 7 miles east of the city of Wheeling. It opened in August 2004 with what was then the only Cabela's within a 5-hour distance. Eventually it featured a JCPenney, Kohl's, Target and Walmart as anchor tenants. It also contains over 100 shops, restaurants, services, car dealerships and attractions such as Menards, Hobby Lobby, Bath & Body Works, Books-A-Million, Lane Bryant, Old Navy, The Shoe Dept. and a 14-screen Marquee Cinemas. With over 1.4 million square feet of retail space, it is the largest shopping complex in the Northern Panhandle of West Virginia.

The center is owned and operated by its developer, the Ohio County Development Authority. It is located at Cabela Drive (Exit 10) off Interstate 70.
