= Wheeling Tunnel =

Tunnel in Wheeling, West Virginia, US

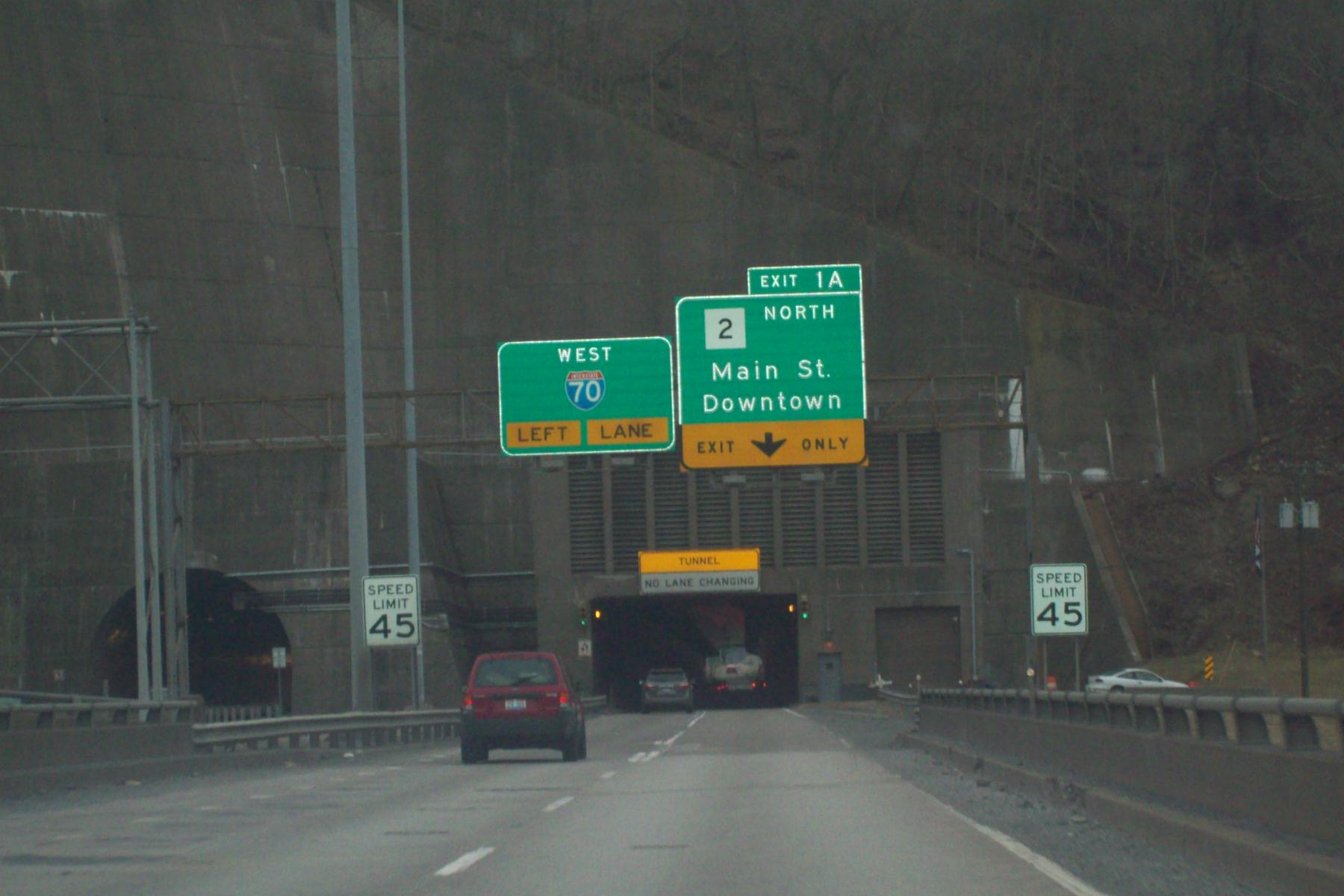
- Westbound tunnel entrance
- Interactive map of Wheeling Tunnel

Overview
- Location: Wheeling, West Virginia
- Coordinates: 40.0727192°N 80.719621°W
- Route: I-70 / US 250

Operation
- Work began: August 22, 1963
- Opened: December 7, 1966
- Operator: WVDOH
- Vehicles per day: 59,600 (2009 AADT)

Technical
- Length: 0.27 mi (430 m)
- No. of lanes: 2 each
- Operating speed: 45 mph (72 km/h)

The Wheeling Tunnel is a set of twin tunnels named for and located in Wheeling, West Virginia. The tunnels are 0.27 miles (430 m) long each, cutting through Wheeling Hill, and each carries two lanes of Interstate 70 and U.S. Route 250. The tunnels originally took three years to construct, costing $6.9 million. Reconstruction of the tunnel, originally planned to take a total of 6 months, took over three years to complete between 2007 and 2010, at a cost of $13.7 million.

== Overview ==
The Wheeling Tunnel sits between exits 1A and 1B on Interstate 70 and U.S. Route 250, which run concurrent through the city of Wheeling. The tunnel cuts through Wheeling Hill, and has two travel lanes in each tube. Due to the closeness of exit 1A to the western end of the tunnels, the tunnels' right lanes function as acceleration and deceleration lanes. Through traffic is restricted to the left lane in each tunnel and lane changes are prohibited.

A series of accidents involving semi-trailer trucks prompted local political candidates to push for trucks to be banned from the tunnel, diverting them to the nearby I-470.

== Construction ==
The twin tunnels, which cost $6.9 million (equivalent to $73 million in 2025) to construct, are lined with a total of 13,000 square feet (1,200 m^{2}) of industrial tile. Then governor William Wallace Barron, and the state roads commissioner broke ground on the tunnel on August 22, 1963, which he stated was the largest single construction project in the state's Interstate Highway program. The construction contract was awarded to C.J. Langenfelder & Son, Inc. located in Baltimore, Maryland. Several workers became ill after being exposed to high amounts of carbon monoxide fumes, which brought construction to a halt in 1964 until ventilation fans were installed. The tunnel officially opened to traffic on December 7, 1966.

== Renovations ==
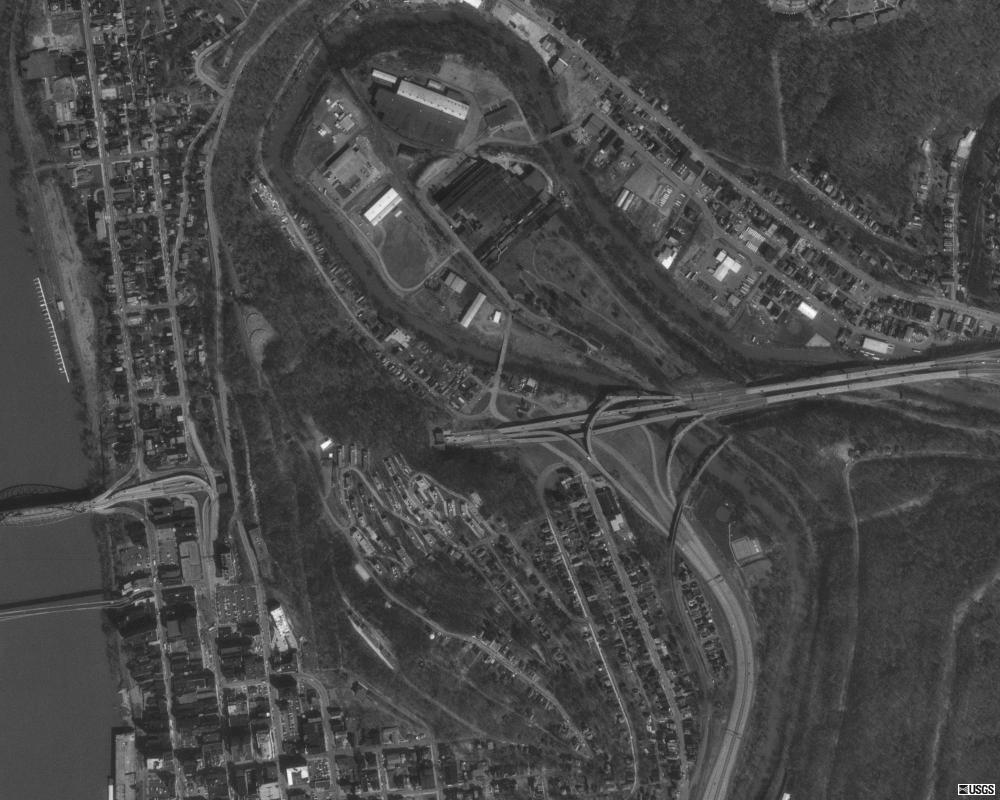
An overview of Wheeling Hill

Plans for the reconstruction of the tunnel were formed in 2005, with reconstruction work beginning in January 2007. Reconstruction of the tunnel was planned to take 3 months, but reconstruction of the eastbound tunnel, which was not totally completed, took over eleven months. After the issues with the reconstruction work, local politicians suggested closing the tunnels altogether, and to just build the freeway over Wheeling Hill, however after opposition from the NAACP and other groups, the suggestions were dropped. Completion of the eastbound tunnel reconstruction begin in July 2008, when the tiles were replaced for the first time with new tiles fabricated by a German tile manufacturer. The Division of Highways had to award the contract to the German company because no other company could complete the request within the time frame required. The original tiles were made by a now-defunct company based in Cleveland. During the second round of eastbound tunnel reconstruction, the westbound tunnel was also closed overnight for construction work. The eastbound tunnel reconstruction was completed on October 31, 2008. The westbound tube was closed in February 2010, and opened a month ahead of schedule in September 2010. The total cost of the project was over double the original bid, totaling $13.7 million, due to the delays.

== See also ==
- Interstate 70 in West Virginia
- U.S. Route 250 in West Virginia
