= Wheeling Suspension Bridge =

Bridge in West Virginia, United States

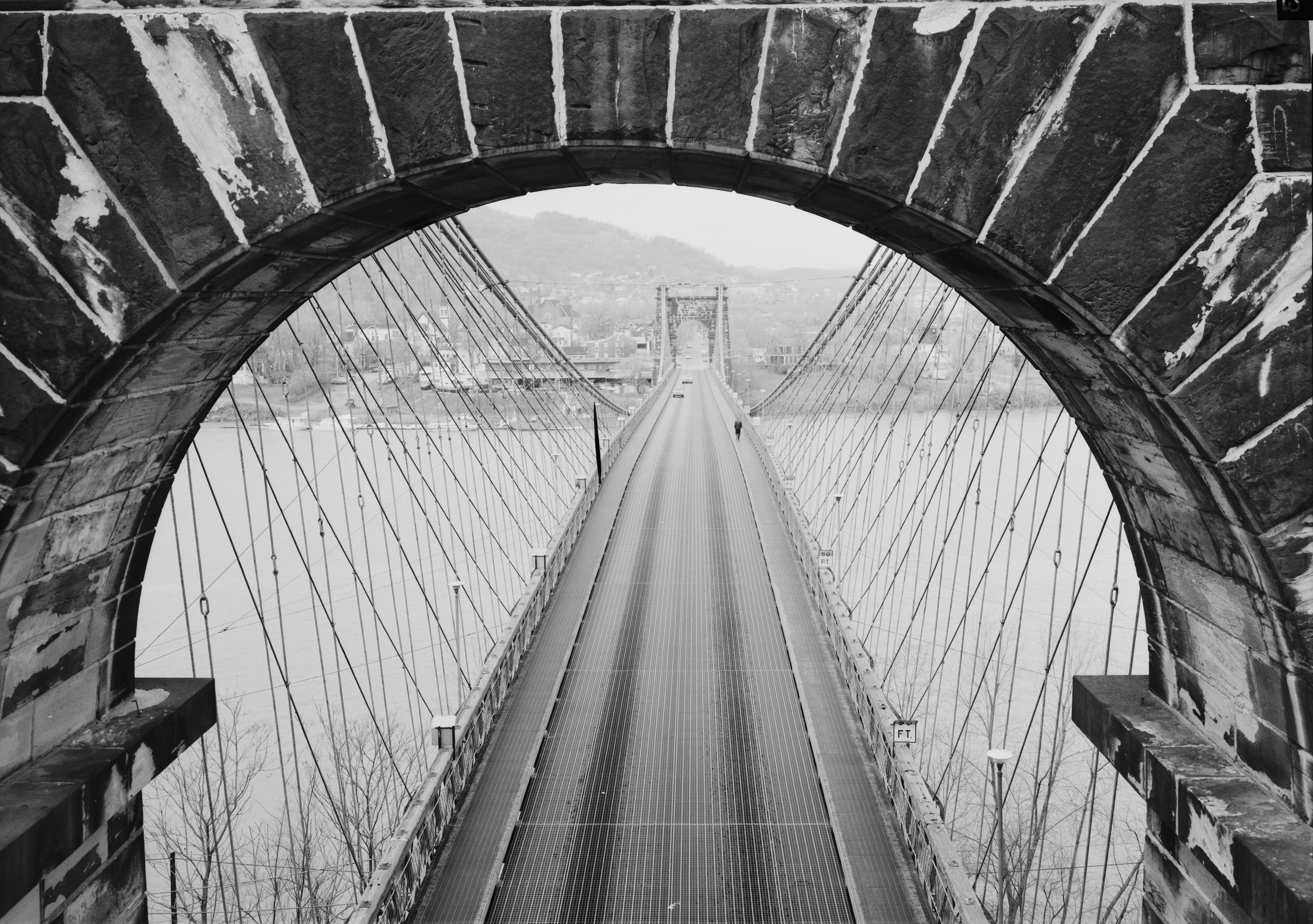
- View from the Wheeling Suspension Bridge, 1977. Photo taken from City of Wheeling side, looking west toward Wheeling Island.
- Coordinates: 40°04′13″N 80°43′38″W
- Carries: Pedestrians
- Crosses: Main channel of the Ohio River
- Locale: Wheeling, West Virginia
- Maintained by: West Virginia Department of Transportation

Characteristics
- Design: Suspension bridge; Originally: gravity-anchored; Currently: cable-stayed
- Longest span: 308 meters (1,010 ft)

History
- Designer: Original: Charles Ellet Jr.; Redesigner: Wilhelm Hildenbrand
- Construction start: 1847
- Construction end: 1849, 1854, 1859, 1872
- Wheeling Suspension Bridge
- U.S. National Register of Historic Places
- U.S. National Historic Landmark
- U.S. Historic district – Contributing property
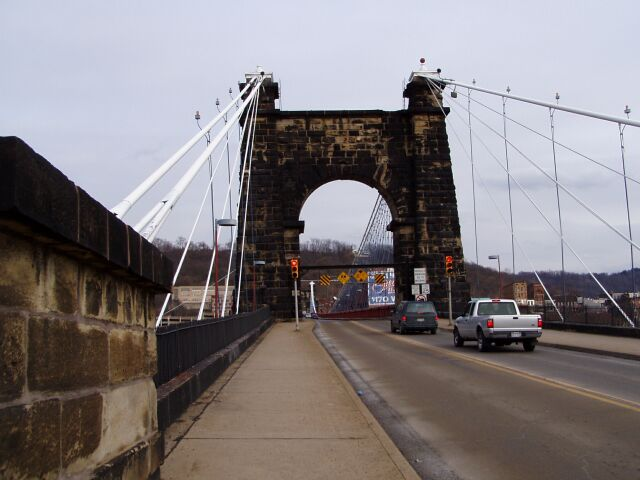
- Photo taken from Wheeling Island side, looking east toward the City of Wheeling

- Location within West Virginia Location within the United States
- Location: Wheeling, West Virginia
- Coordinates: 40°4′13″N 80°43′38″W
- Architect: Charles Ellet Jr., Washington Roebling
- Part of: Wheeling Island Historic District (ID92000320)
- NRHP reference No.: 70000662

Significant dates
- Added to NRHP: January 26, 1970
- Designated NHL: May 15, 1975
- Designated CP: April 2, 1992

Location
- Interactive map of Wheeling Suspension Bridge

The Wheeling Suspension Bridge is a suspension bridge spanning the main channel of the Ohio River at Wheeling, West Virginia. It was the largest suspension bridge in the world from 1849 until 1851. Charles Ellet Jr. (who also worked on the Niagara Falls Suspension Bridge) designed it and supervised construction of what became the first bridge to span a major river west of the Appalachian Mountains. It linked the eastern and western section of the National Road, and became especially strategically important during the American Civil War. Litigation in the United States Supreme Court concerning its obstruction of the new high steamboat smokestacks eventually cleared the way for other bridges, especially needed by expanding railroads. Because this bridge was designed during the horse-and-buggy era, 2-ton weight limits and vehicle separation requirements applied in later years until it was closed to automobile traffic in September 2019.

The main span is 1,010 feet (310 m) from tower to tower. The east tower rests on the Wheeling shore, while the west tower is on Wheeling Island. The east tower is 153.5 feet (46.8 m) above the low-water level of the river, or 82 feet (25 m) from the base of the masonry. The west tower is 132.75 feet (40.46 m) above low water, with 69 feet (21 m) of masonry. Detailed analysis of the bridge was conducted by Dr. Emory Kemp.

The Wheeling Suspension Bridge was designated a National Historic Landmark on May 15, 1975. It is located in the Wheeling Island Historic District.

== History ==
A charter was granted to the Wheeling and Belmont Bridge Company in 1816 to construct a bridge to extend the National Road (also known as the Cumberland Pike because it began in Cumberland, Maryland) across the Ohio River. Although the U.S. Congress authorized the National Road in 1806, and cities competing for that crossing included Wellsburg, West Virginia and Steubenville, Ohio, that bridge connecting Wheeling with Belmont, Ohio was nevertheless completed. The National Road formally reached Wheeling on August 1, 1818, but then ferries took passengers and freight to the other section of the National Road which began in Belmont and continued westward. In 1820 Congress authorized the National Road's extension to St. Louis, Missouri.

Another attempt to charter and construct a bridge across the Ohio River was made more than a decade later. That began in state legislatures and ultimately succeeded in getting the bridge built using new technology. It also produced two rounds of important litigation in the United States Supreme Court, in 1849–1852 and again in 1854–56.

=== Technology and delays ===
Since 1820 Congress had spent much money to clear navigation obstacles from the Ohio River, which flows from Pittsburgh down through Wheeling (then in Virginia) to Cincinnati, Ohio and eventually reaches the Mississippi River at Cairo, Illinois slightly downstream of St. Louis, Missouri (which became a major inland commercial center). Goods and produce could thus ship fairly cheaply and quickly down the Ohio River and reach the ocean port of New Orleans, Louisiana. Senator Henry Clay of Kentucky had become a great proponent of internal improvements, in part because the Ohio River drained into the northern part of his state and contributed to the growth of Louisville (as did the Louisville and Portland Canal completed in 1830 to bypass the Ohio River's only major rapids). Both road and navigation improvements helped bring manufactured goods and people to Kentucky, western Virginia, Ohio, Indiana, etc., and as well as allowed produce and natural resources to reach eastern, southern and even international markets. However, President Andrew Jackson had a much stingier view of internal improvements than Senator Clay, preferring to leave their construction to private or individual state interests, if at all.

Meanwhile, ferrying the U.S. mail, as well as passengers and goods across the Ohio river at Wheeling to connect the two sections of the National Road proved cumbersome and expensive. Maintaining the (initially free) National Road also cost money, especially after floods in 1832 left debris, as well as destroyed shore facilities. In 1835 Congress (dominated by Jacksonian Democrats) gave existing sections to the adjoining states, in order to pass on those maintenance costs. In the interim, new steamboat technology helped goods move upstream as well as downstream, and both railroad and bridge technology had also evolved. Nonetheless, navigation on the Ohio River between Wheeling and Pittsburgh remained hazardous at certain times of year (because of ice and debris in winter and spring floods, as well as summer low water).

Pittsburgh and Wheeling both competed to become commercial hubs connecting east and west across the central Appalachian Mountains. To the north, the Erie Canal (completed 1825 between Buffalo, New York on Lake Erie and Albany, New York on the Hudson River) and the Welland Canal (completed 1829 connecting Lake Erie and Lake Ontario bypassing Niagara Falls and creating the St. Lawrence Seaway) proved a commercial boon even to cities some distance away (especially New York City as a seaport, but also Erie, Pennsylvania). Soon, Pennsylvania competed by subsidizing first a short canal ending at Pittsburgh, then railroads connecting Pittsburgh to Philadelphia, which had rail and water connections to New York City and was a major international port in its own right. In 1835, a new incline railroad connected Pittsburgh to Ohio valley produce and goods. The combination of Pennsylvania railroads and canals became known as the "Main Line". In 1846 Pennsylvania's legislature chartered the Pennsylvania Railroad to connect its state capital Harrisburg (which had many connections to Philadelphia) with Pittsburgh. While transappalachian commerce initially boomed in part because canals enabled one man, one boy, a horse and a boat to transport what had previously involved ten men, ten wagons and sixty horses (and the Pennsylvania route was shorter route for most Ohio valley goods and produce than the New York routes), toll revenues proved insufficient. Since 1844 Pennsylvania had been trying to sell its unprofitable investment.

A transappalachian route through Virginia could attract southern shippers. However, Virginia's legislature was dominated by plantation owners (from the coastal east and southern areas) who already had access to cheap river transport for many months every year. Meanwhile, the Baltimore and Ohio Railroad was chartered in 1827, reached Harpers Ferry in 1834 and soon out-competed the Chesapeake and Ohio Canal (which never reached Ohio) for commercial transport down the Potomac River Valley to Chesapeake Bay. The B&O proved a boon for Baltimore, Maryland. The B&O wanted to connect to Virginia, as well as the Ohio River valley through Parkersburg, but Virginia legislators repeatedly denied it permission to build a line along the Shenandoah and Kanawha valleys. Virginia instead subsidized first the James River Canal, then railroads (eventually, the Virginia Central Railroad into the Shenandoah Valley and the Virginia and Tennessee Railroad and Covington and Ohio Railroad across the Appalachians) through its higher Appalachian mountains (2,200 feet (670 m) in the proposed Virginia canal route vs the Erie Canal that crossed the Appalachians at 650 feet (200 m) but much further north). Virginia's legislators wanted to direct its commerce towards its capital (Richmond) and its seaport (Norfolk) rather than toward Baltimore. However, Wheeling had become Virginia's second largest city by 1840, and its interests also lobbied to become a B&O terminus, linking the railroad to cheap river transportation. Especially after the B&O reached Cumberland, Maryland in 1842, railroad technology was out-competing the National Road (which had linked to the C&O Canal at Cumberland). The Virginia General Assembly in the 1830s and through the 1840s required the B&O to take a relatively northern route across the Appalachians in the then-Commonwealth and connect at Wheeling. The B&O finally acquiesced after 1847, its threats to move its transappalachian passage to Pittsburgh having proven idle and Pennsylvania having chartered the Pennsylvania Railroad.

While the Wheeling and Belmont Bridge Company languished for nearly two decades, in 1836, it managed to raise sufficient private funds to build a wooden bridge between Zane's Island (officially renamed Wheeling Island in 1902) and the Ohio shore. Nonetheless, a navigation channel still remained between Wheeling and that island.

Pennsylvania legislators for decades blocked federal legislation to authorize (much less subsidize) the proposed Wheeling bridge. In 1836, Federal engineers proposed a suspension bridge with a removable section to enable steamboat smokestacks to clear, but Congress tabled it. In 1838, the U.S. postmaster reported 53 irregularities in mail service around Wheeling between January and April. An 1840 postmaster's report urging a bridge to avoid such mail interruptions got lost. Another proposal requiring hinges on high steamboat smokestacks also initially failed. In 1844, a steamboat packet line began connecting Pittsburgh and Cincinnati (nearly bypassing Wheeling). As traffic on the National Road also languished, Virginia's congressmen finally abandoned their efforts to win federal funding for the Wheeling bridge in early 1847. That year civic boosters instead formed a new company to build the bridge, and the new officers requested proposals in May 1847. The Baltimore and Ohio Railroad track to Wheeling was finally completed in 1853, the same year a packet line connected Wheeling and Louisville.

=== Construction ===
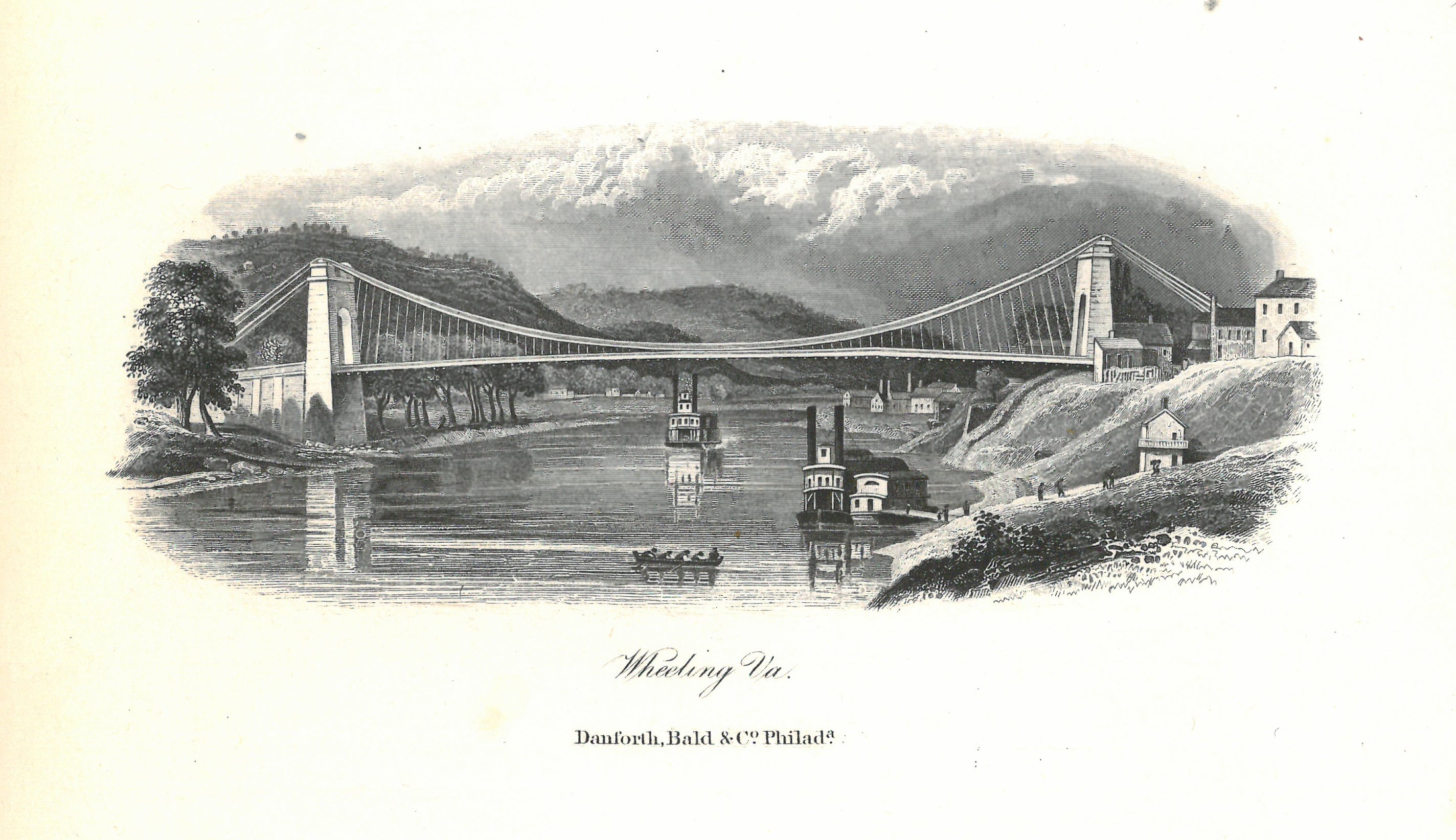
Frontispiece to the Wheeling & Belmont Bridge Company's printed argument delivered to the U.S. Supreme Court in the case Pennsylvania v. Wheeling and Belmont Bridge Company, 54 U.S. 518 (1850)

After these and other delays, in 1847 the legislatures of Virginia and Ohio jointly issued a new Wheeling bridge charter. Charles Ellet and John A. Roebling were invited to submit designs and estimates for a bridge over the east channel of the river to Wheeling Island. Ellett was the chief engineer of the Virginia Central Railroad and in 1853 would build a railroad over the Blue Ridge Mountains at Rock Fish Gap. The new Wheeling bridge would be of a suspension design, since Ellet and Roebling were the foremost authorities. It would also be 90 feet (27 m) above low water. Their initial calculations relied on the highest smokestacks being about 60 feet (18 m), but stack height kept increasing, so the planned bridge came to impede the largest steamboats with high stacks. Ellet received the contract award in 1847 with a bid of $120,000 (Roebling's for a shorter double-span bridge was $130,000), and construction began the same year. The bridge was completed in 1849 for about $250,000.

=== Supreme Court litigation (1849–1852) ===
Because the relative legal status of the new steamboat and railroad technologies was unclear, as was the jurisdiction of the United States federal courts over bridges and navigable waters, the litigation concerning the first bridge to cross a major river west of the Appalachian Mountains had great effect. During the previous years, the United States Supreme Court had divided concerning the scope of the federal power in the Commerce Clause, as well as extent of concurrent state powers. In 1847, in U.S. v. New Bedford Bridge Company Justice Levi Woodbury on circuit duty had determined that no federal law defined obstruction of navigable waterways and upheld a drawbridge near the port, and Justice Samuel Nelson had done similarly while a justice of the New York Supreme Court.

The Commonwealth of Pennsylvania (through its attorney general Cornelius Darragh) and Pittsburgh interests represented by Edwin M. Stanton and Robert J. Walker sought an injunction against the bridge from the U.S. Supreme Court justice supervising the geographical area, Robert C. Grier, who had been a Pennsylvania state judge in Pittsburgh and surrounding Allegheny County, Pennsylvania. Justice Grier was surprised at this use of equity, especially because it was first brought in the Supreme Court and not before a U.S. district judge. It was also begun on July 28, 1849 during the Supreme Court's summer 1849 recess. Pennsylvania's attorneys argued that the new bridge was a nuisance that obstructed the Ohio River (although anchored on one bank 100 feet (30 m) above the ground). The Wheeling and Belmont Bridge Company's charter from Virginia required that it not obstruct navigation on the river, and Article IV of the Northwest Ordinance of 1787 labeled the navigable waters leading into the Mississippi and St. Lawrence Rivers "common highways" and required they be "forever free". The Pittsburgh and Cincinnati steamboat line operated new vessels with very high smokestacks which would be damaged by collisions with the bridge, and stopping in Wheeling to transship passengers and freight would be expensive for the company. Pennsylvania also argued harm to its "Main Line" toll revenues. While Virginia never finished its proposed canal and railroad system, the Pennsylvania system never was profitable. It became less so after the Wheeling route became easier, and would become even less used were the Baltimore and Ohio Railroad to construct a track on the bridge or its own bridge nearby. During the litigation voters wanted to sell it, but no deal was finalized.

The Wheeling Bridge Company, represented by Charles W. Russell and U.S. Attorney general Reverdy Johnson (supposedly in a private capacity, but who had denied Pennsylvania's request for his federal office's assistance) argued the bridge helped the U.S. mails (delayed during icy as well as high and low water periods) and also connected military posts. They also argued the public's right to cross the river, as well as Pennsylvania's failure to prove irremediable injury because it had not brought suit during the two years the bridge was under construction and technology also existed to lower steamboat smokestacks (as was done on a canal near Louisville, Kentucky crossed by much lower bridges). Meanwhile, Virginia attorney Alexander H. H. Stuart also tried to convince Pennsylvania's governor William F. Johnston that his state's arguments in this case (if ratified by the U.S. Supreme Court) could jeopardize Pennsylvania's bridges across the Allegheny and Monongahela Rivers. Other attorneys and engineers (including Ellett) approached the U.S. Congress and Pennsylvania, Ohio, Indiana and Virginia state legislatures. Finally, the Hempfield Railroad was chartered to connect Wheeling and Pittsburgh.

Justice Grier held a hearing in Philadelphia on August 16, 1849, and on August 30 refused the requested injunction to remove the bridge. Instead, he referred the matter to the full court. That heard argument on February 25, 1850, as well as reviewed extensive depositions (361 printed pages). Rather than an opinion, on May 29, 1850, Justice Nelson (over a dissent by Justice Peter V. Daniel who would have refused jurisdiction, in which Chief Justice Taney joined) issued a one-page order appointing Reuben Hyde Walworth (whom President John Tyler had nominated to the Court but the Senate never considered confirming, and who was an expert in equity) as commissioner.

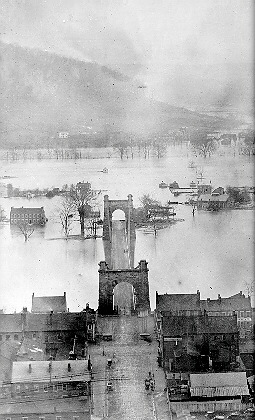
Flood of 1852 – earliest known photograph of the Wheeling Suspension Bridge

Walworth received considerable scientific and commercial evidence, including a report from U.S. Army engineer William Jarvis McAlpine. However, both parties were dissatisfied with Walworth's 770-page report, issued in December 1851. Pittsburgh was disappointed that Walworth refused to order the bridge removed. Virginia and Ohio interests complained because he found the waterway obstructed and recommended raising the bridge an additional 20 feet (6.1 m)—which would cause enormous technical difficulties and additional cost. However, after reviewing both parties' exceptions, receiving another report from McAlpine and hearing more argument on February 23 and 24, the U.S. Supreme Court also refused to order the bridge removed, but instead amended the new required height to 111 feet (34 m). The court accepted the bridge company's proposal to study a removable portion as an alternative. Thus, Edwin Stanton won a nearly pyrrhic victory on Pennsylvania's behalf but the bridge remained standing.

=== Destruction, rebuilding, lobbying and Supreme Court round 2 (1854–1856) ===
On May 17, 1854, a strong windstorm destroyed the deck of the bridge through torsional movement and vertical undulations that rose almost as high as the towers. Its rebuilding prompted the 1856 litigation. Walworth's report undergirded the Court's decisions in both 1852 and 1856.

Justice Grier issued an injunction against the bridge's rebuilding during the court's normal summer break. The rebuilding continued anyway. Ellet's workmen made temporary repairs in eight weeks (although further improvements by William McComas would take another year). Meanwhile, the bridge company asked Congress to investigate whether the judge had been bribed (an investigation that was quietly dropped when the case resolved), and complained that the injunction violated both Congress's sovereignty and that of Virginia (which had authorized the bridge). Plus, the Ohio legislature petitioned Congress to save the bridge, which the Virginia and Indiana legislatures (and some dissident Pennsylvanians) joined. Through the efforts of Wheeling Congressman George W. Thompson and others, Congress passed a law that designated the bridge a post road before the Supreme Court's 1852 decision could go into effect, and that designation proved the key to the 1856 decision. Meanwhile, the Supreme Court heard a second set of legal arguments concerning the Wheeling Bridge. Justice Nelson then delivered the next opinion of the court, in December, this time upheld the bridge as an exercise of Congressional power over military and postal roads, despite Justice McLean's objection.

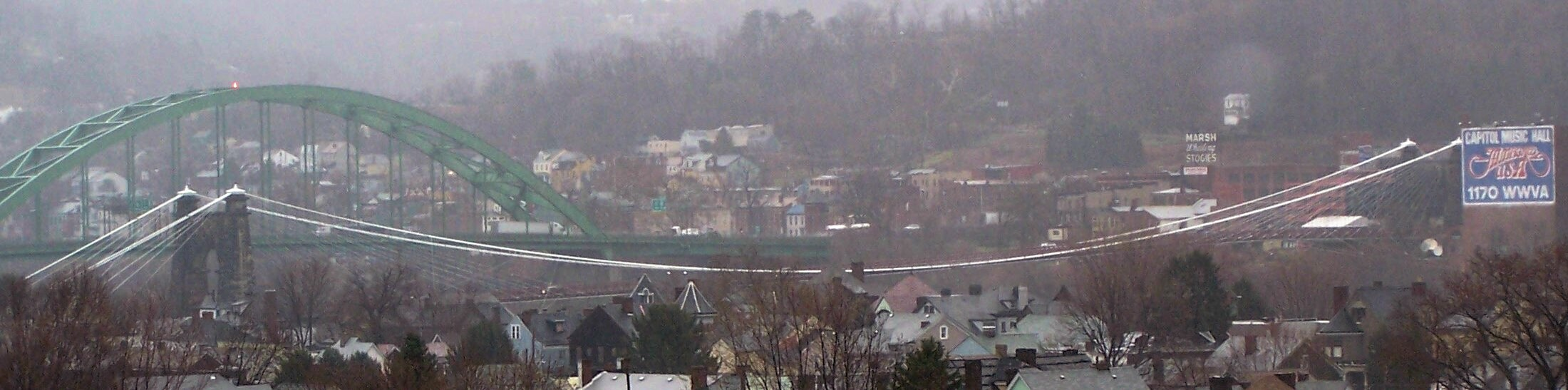
A view of the Wheeling Suspension Bridge from Wheeling Island (looking north-east). Located directly behind it is the Fort Henry Bridge.

=== Consequences and precedent ===
In 1859 Ellett's partner William McComas made further improvements. Completion of the B&O Railroad to Wheeling in 1853, and competition from a new steamboat line connecting Wheeling with Louisville proved fatal to both steamboat companies, who soon dismantled their ships or sold them downriver for the Mississippi trade. Furthermore, additional bridges across the Ohio River were proposed for Parkersburg, Bellaire and Steubenville.

A truss pivot drawbridge across the Mississippi River between Davenport, Iowa and Rock Island, Illinois was completed in 1856, over the opposition of steamboat and other interests in St. Louis. They also brought suit, but in a lower court. That initial legal action (defended by lawyer Abraham Lincoln) did not reach the U.S. Supreme Court. However, a case concerning the collision of the disabled steamer Effie Afton and that Illinois/Iowa bridge would do so decades later, and be resolved in 1872.

=== Civil War ===
The Wheeling Suspension Bridge was strategically important to Union forces during the American Civil War. Confederate raids destroyed many bridges on the Baltimore and Ohio Railroad, but never attacked the bridge in Union-controlled Wheeling.

Charles Ellet was loyal to the Union. He built and commanded the United States Ram Fleet on the Mississippi River.

The Restored Government of Virginia was created after the Wheeling Convention (heavily attended by representatives of counties served by the Baltimore and Ohio), and ultimately the state of West Virginia was recognized in 1863. Supreme Court litigation concerning apportionment of the debt Virginia had incurred in subsidizing bridge and railroad improvements was not resolved until 1915.

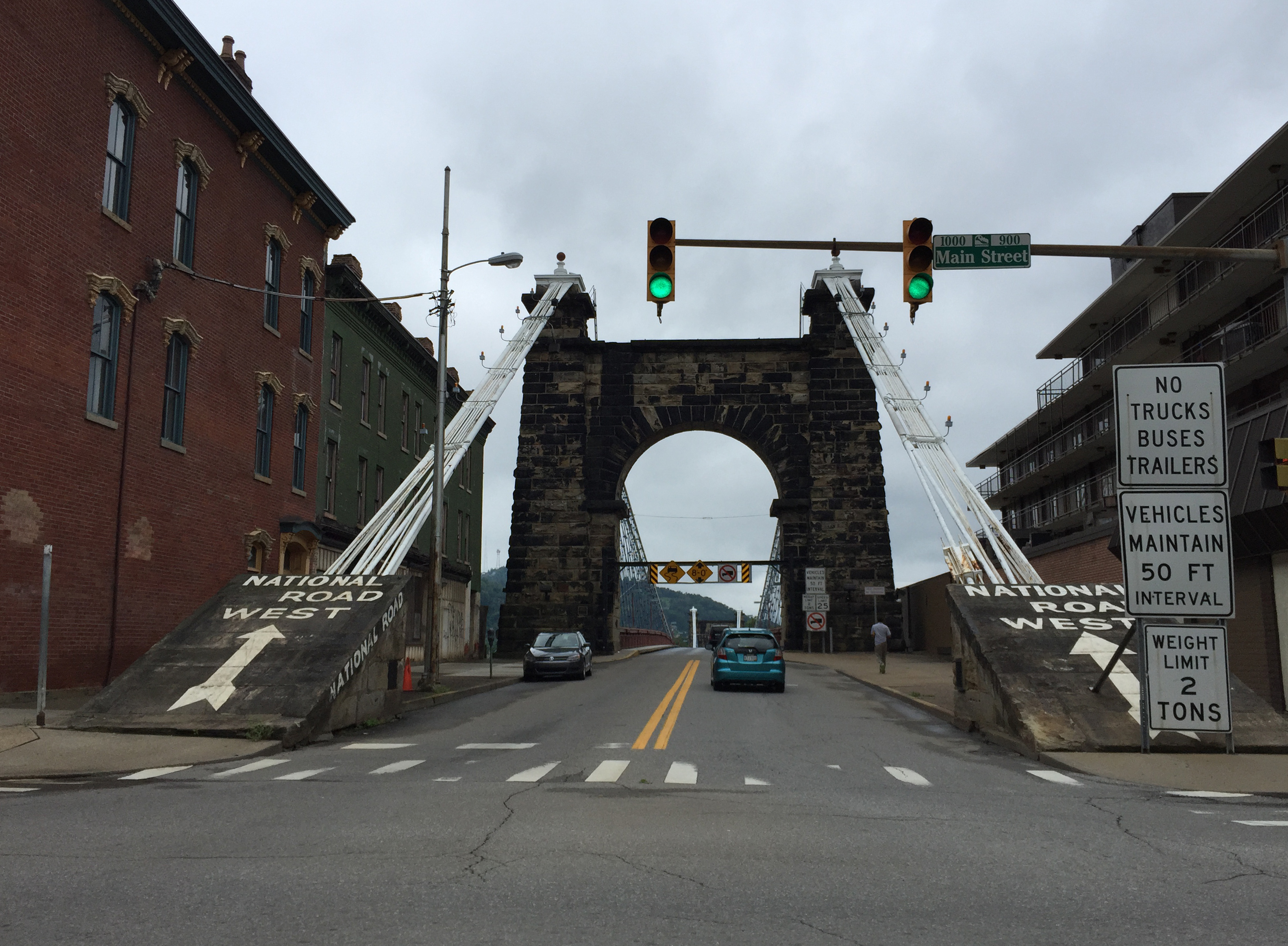
View west from the east end of the bridge in downtown Wheeling. Note the multiple warning signs restricting access.

=== Later technological improvements ===
In 1874 William Hildenbrand oversaw additional improvements on the Wheeling Bridge. A 1953 report concerning the suspension cables found them either original or from the 1860 reconstruction. The deck stiffening truss is believed to be from the same period. Auxiliary stay cables were added in 1871–72 to a design by Washington Roebling and Hildebrand.

The bridge company sold the bridge to the city of Wheeling in 1927. Additional repairs were made in 1930.

In 1956, the deck was completely rebuilt, when the road was widened from 16.25 feet (4.95 m) to 20 feet (6.1 m) and the sidewalks correspondingly narrowed. The road and sidewalk were reconstructed with an open steel grating that reduces wind resistance, and rests on lightened steel floor beams.

== Modern weight restrictions and issues ==
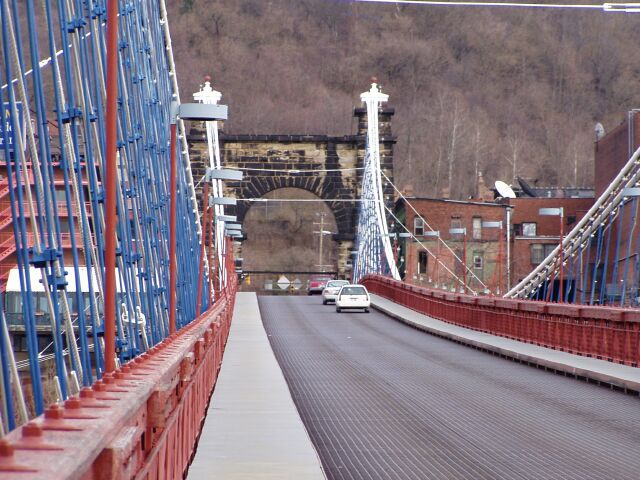
Looking east toward downtown Wheeling

The bridge spans a distance of 1,010 feet (310 m) across the Ohio River and allows barges to pass underneath. It remains the oldest vehicular suspension bridge in the United States still in use and is listed as both a National Historic Landmark and Historic Civil Engineering Landmark.

In the early 1980s, the West Virginia Division of Highways restored the bridge. The bridge remains in active service, but with weight and height restrictions since it was designed before automobiles and trucks were invented. At the time of construction, a horse and buggy was the heaviest live load that would be expected. Currently, the bridge has a (per vehicle) weight limit of 4,000 lb (1,800 kg), making it unsuitable for trucks, buses, or other heavy vehicles.

On February 17, 2011, a vehicle driving at high speed lost control and crashed into the sidewalk panels on the bridge. The bridge was closed for four to five days, first for inspection, then to repair the panels, as well as other minor repairs. On March 2, 2013, a non-load bearing cable snapped, causing the bridge to be closed until the cable was repaired and detailed inspections were completed.

On March 23, 2016, the bridge was closed to all vehicle and pedestrian traffic after a Greyhound bus attempted to cross the bridge and damaged it. It was reopened to all traffic (within the height and weight limits) after WVDOH inspected the bridge. High vehicles could be subject to crosswinds on the bridge.

In May 2016, the Wheeling police department vowed to begin enforcing the two ton weight and vehicle separations limits on the bridge more strictly. Traffic is advised to keep at least 50 feet (15 m) between vehicles. Additionally, traffic lights at both ends only allow a certain number of cars onto the bridge at one time.

== Closure to vehicular traffic ==
On September 24, 2019, the West Virginia Department of Transportation indefinitely closed the bridge to vehicular traffic after continued public disregard of weight limit and safety signs. Earlier in the year, the bridge was closed for six weeks after a tour bus - which far exceeded the posted two-ton weight limit - attempted to cross the bridge, only to get stuck under a barrier. The bridge was deemed safe and reopened to traffic in August after officials from the Division of Highways installed a height barrier with hard restraints to attempt to eliminate such overweight crossings. In the time since, operators of additional vehicles over the weight limit continued to ignore the restrictions and repeatedly drove on the bridge. The West Virginia Division of Highways is working on a long-term rehabilitation plan to sustain the bridge far into the future, in the meantime, the bridge remains open to pedestrians and bicyclists.

Wheeling mayor Glenn Elliott requested that the bridge be reopened to motor vehicles, but the Division of Highways denied his request, thus sealing its fate of remaining closed until a permanent solution can be developed against drivers who choose to ignore the limits on the bridge. According to the WVDOH, several proposed methods of keeping careless drivers at bay, such as weigh scales and enforcement cameras, are not possible.

On February 4, 2026, the WVDOH announced that motor vehicles would be permanently banned from the bridge, and that improvements would be made to better facilitate pedestrian and bicycle traffic.

== See also ==
- List of bridges documented by the Historic American Engineering Record in West Virginia
- List of crossings of the Ohio River
- List of historic sites in Ohio County, West Virginia
- National Register of Historic Places in Ohio County, West Virginia
- List of National Historic Landmarks in West Virginia

Browse numbered routes
← US 250	list	→ WV 252
