= Fairview, West Virginia (disambiguation) =

Fairview, West Virginia may refer to the following places in the U.S. state of West Virginia:

- Fairview, West Virginia, a town in Marion County
- Fairview, Marshall County, West Virginia, an unincorporated community in Marshall County
- Fairview, Mason County, West Virginia, an unincorporated community in Mason County
- Fairview, Mingo County, West Virginia, an unincorporated community in Mingo County
- Fairview (near Elkins), Randolph County, West Virginia, an unincorporated community in Randolph County near the city of Elkins
- Fairview (near Helvetia), Randolph County, West Virginia, an unincorporated community in Randolph County near the community of Helvetia
- Fairview, Wetzel County, West Virginia, an unincorporated community in Wetzel County
- Fairview, Greenbrier County, West Virginia, a ghost town in Greenbrier County
- New Manchester, West Virginia, an unincorporated community in Hancock County was formerly known as "Fairview"
- Wayne, West Virginia, the county seat of Wayne County was originally incorporated as Fairview
