= Bannon =

Bannon is an Irish surname. The following are people bearing that surname:

- Ann Bannon (born 1932), American author of lesbian pulp fiction novels
- Bernard Bannon (1874−1938), English cricketer
- Bonnie Bannon (1913–1989), American actress, model, dancer
- Brian Bannon (1930–2017), Australian politician from New South Wales
- Bruce Bannon (born 1951), American professional football player
- Chad Bannon (born 1970), American television and film actor
- Christine Bannon-Rodrigues (born 1966), American martial artist and actress
- David "Race" Bannon (born 1963), American fraudster who posed as a former Interpol agent
- "Des" Bannon (1923–2000), Australian rugby player
- Dorothy Bannon (1885–1940), British nurse
- Eamonn Bannon (born 1958), Scottish football player
- Henry T. Bannon (1867–1950), U.S. Congressman from Ohio (1905–1909), historian, and attorney
- J.G. Bannon (1874–1937), American college football coach
- Jack Bannon (disambiguation)
- Jacob Bannon (born 1976), American musician and artist
- James Bannon (disambiguation)
- Jim Bannon (1911–1984), American radio and film actor
- Jimmy Bannon (1871–1948), American baseball player
- John Bannon (disambiguation)
  - John Bannon (1943–2015), Australian politician and academic
- Kevin Bannon (born 1957), American basketball coach
- Paul Bannon (fl. 2006–2013), Gaelic footballer (with about 6 seasons of league play)
- Paul (Anthony) Bannon (1956–2016), Irish player of association football, 1975 to 1995 (with less than a season of league play of Gaelic football)
- Philip M. Bannon (1872–1940), American Marine Corps Brevet Medal recipient
- Rylan Bannon (born 1996), American baseball player
- Séamus Bannon (1927–1990), Irish retired sportsman
- Shane Bannon (born 1989), American football player
- Steve Bannon (born 1953), American media executive, political strategist, and former investment banker

== Fictional characters ==
- Captain Bannon, a character in the video game World in Conflict
- Roger T. "Race" Bannon, a fictional character featured in the TV series, Jonny Quest

== See also ==
- O'Bannon (disambiguation)
- Banon
- Bannan (disambiguation)
- Bannen (disambiguation)
