= Benwood, West Virginia =

City in West Virginia, US

- City
- Seal

- Location of Benwood in Marshall County, West Virginia.
- Coordinates: 40°0′46″N 80°44′2″W
- Country: United States
- State: West Virginia
- County: Marshall
- Chartered: February 28, 1853
- Incorporated: March 2, 1853; February 25, 1882; February 22, 1895

Area
  - Total: 1.86 sq mi (4.82 km^{2})
  - Land: 1.30 sq mi (3.36 km^{2})
  - Water: 0.56 sq mi (1.46 km^{2})
- Elevation: 646 ft (197 m)

Population (2020)
  - Total: 1,252
  - Estimate (2021): 1,245
  - Density: 984.9/sq mi (380.27/km^{2})
- Time zone: UTC-5 (Eastern (EST))
  - Summer (DST): UTC-4 (EDT)
- ZIP code: 26031
- Area code: 304
- FIPS code: 54-06340
- GNIS feature ID: 1553863
- Website: benwoodwv.gov

Benwood is a city in Marshall County, West Virginia, United States, along the Ohio River. It is part of the Wheeling metropolitan area. The population was 1,269 at the 2020 census.

== History ==
Benwood was chartered in 1853 and incorporated in 1895. The name of the city is derived from "Ben's Woods", as Benjamin McMechen inherited that portion of land from the estate of his father, William McMechen, and built his homestead upon it. The neighboring city of McMechen is named after William McMechen and his family, who were among the earliest settlers of this area.

Benwood was the location of the third worst mine disaster to occur in the state of West Virginia. At approximately 7:05 AM EST on Monday, April 28, 1924, the coal mine of the Wheeling Steel Corporation's mill located in Benwood exploded, killing all 119 men who were working in the coal mine at the time. The majority of the miners killed were recent immigrants of Polish, Italian, Greek, Croatian, Serbian, Hungarian, Russian, Ukrainian and Lithuanian descent.

Eighteen years after the devastating 1924 explosion at the Wheeling Steel mine, Benwood was once again the location of another tragic coal mining disaster. On Monday, May 18, 1942, the coal mine of the Hitchman Coal & Coke Company exploded, killing 5 men.

== Geography ==
Benwood is located at 40°00′46″N 80°44′02″W (40.012748, -80.734008).

According to the United States Census Bureau, the city has a total area of 1.86 square miles (4.82 km^{2}), of which 1.30 square miles (3.37 km^{2}) is land and 0.56 square miles (1.45 km^{2}) is water.

== Demographics ==
Historical population
Census	Pop.	Note	%±
1890	2,934		—
1900	4,511		53.7%
1910	4,976		10.3%
1920	4,773		−4.1%
1930	3,950		−17.2%
1940	3,608		−8.7%
1950	3,485		−3.4%
1960	2,850		−18.2%
1970	2,737		−4.0%
1980	1,994		−27.1%
1990	1,669		−16.3%
2000	1,585		−5.0%
2010	1,420		−10.4%
2020	1,252		−11.8%
2021 (est.)	1,245		−0.6%
U.S. Decennial Census

=== 2020 census ===
As of the 2020 census, Benwood had a population of 1,252. The median age was 41.6 years. 21.4% of residents were under the age of 18 and 17.9% of residents were 65 years of age or older. For every 100 females there were 92.9 males, and for every 100 females age 18 and over there were 87.8 males age 18 and over.

93.4% of residents lived in urban areas, while 6.6% lived in rural areas.

There were 576 households in Benwood, of which 24.5% had children under the age of 18 living in them. Of all households, 30.6% were married-couple households, 24.8% were households with a male householder and no spouse or partner present, and 35.8% were households with a female householder and no spouse or partner present. About 39.0% of all households were made up of individuals and 16.7% had someone living alone who was 65 years of age or older.

There were 706 housing units, of which 18.4% were vacant. The homeowner vacancy rate was 3.1% and the rental vacancy rate was 12.0%.

Racial composition as of the 2020 census
Race	Number	Percent
White	1,125	89.9%
Black or African American	35	2.8%
American Indian and Alaska Native	0	0.0%
Asian	7	0.6%
Native Hawaiian and Other Pacific Islander	0	0.0%
Some other race	0	0.0%
Two or more races	85	6.8%
Hispanic or Latino (of any race)	22	1.8%

=== 2010 census ===
As of the census of 2010, there were 1,420 people, 654 households, and 357 families residing in the city. The population density was 1,092.3 inhabitants per square mile (421.7/km^{2}). There were 761 housing units at an average density of 585.4 per square mile (226.0/km^{2}). The racial makeup of the city was 95.8% White, 1.3% African American, 0.1% Asian, and 2.8% from two or more races. Hispanic or Latino of any race were 1.0% of the population.

There were 654 households, of which 24.6% had children under the age of 18 living with them, 31.5% were married couples living together, 17.7% had a female householder with no husband present, 5.4% had a male householder with no wife present, and 45.4% were non-families. 39.8% of all households were made up of individuals, and 16.7% had someone living alone who was 65 years of age or older. The average household size was 2.17 and the average family size was 2.94.

The median age in the city was 40.5 years. 22.9% of residents were under the age of 18; 8.4% were between the ages of 18 and 24; 22.4% were from 25 to 44; 29.6% were from 45 to 64; and 16.5% were 65 years of age or older. The gender makeup of the city was 47.4% male and 52.6% female.

=== 2000 census ===
As of the census of 2000, there were 1,585 people, 706 households, and 429 families residing in the city. The population density was 1,268.7 people per square mile (489.6/km^{2}). There were 811 housing units at an average density of 649.2 per square mile (250.5/km^{2}). The racial makeup of the city was 98.23% White, 1.14% African American, 0.06% Native American, 0.06% Asian, 0.06% Pacific Islander, and 0.44% from two or more races. Hispanic or Latino of any race were 0.19% of the population.

There were 706 households, out of which 25.9% had children under the age of 18 living with them, 39.7% were married couples living together, 17.3% had a female householder with no husband present, and 39.1% were non-families. 34.6% of all households were made up of individuals, and 17.7% had someone living alone who was 65 years of age or older. The average household size was 2.25 and the average family size was 2.90.

In the city the population was spread out, with 22.0% under the age of 18, 8.6% from 18 to 24, 26.3% from 25 to 44, 22.0% from 45 to 64, and 21.0% who were 65 years of age or older. The median age was 40 years. For every 100 females, there were 81.6 males. For every 100 females age 18 and over, there were 78.9 males.

The median income for a household in the city was $20,478, and the median income for a family was $27,232. Males had a median income of $23,906 versus $16,827 for females. The per capita income for the city was $15,543. About 19.5% of families and 21.5% of the population were below the poverty line, including 30.6% of those under age 18 and 16.2% of those age 65 or over.

== Neighborhoods ==
Benwood is partitioned into four sections (North Benwood, Center Benwood, South Benwood and Boggs Run) each connected by either Marshall Street or West Virginia Route 2.

=== North Benwood ===
North Benwood is the primary commercial area of the small city and contains several businesses and fast food restaurants. While all of Benwood lies in a flood zone, North Benwood tends to be hit hardest by the floods of the Ohio River.

=== Center Benwood ===
Slightly to the south lies Center Benwood, which is the primary residential section of the city and contains Saint John Roman Catholic Church, Benwood City Park (established in 1973), the Fourth Street Playground, the city building, the fire, water and police departments, the post office, and the Blake Brothers Post No. 46 American Legion. Center Benwood is laid out in a rectangular grid, approximately 1 mile around divided 4 blocks long and 3 streets wide. Center Benwood used to be hit very hard by the devastating floods of the Ohio River, but a flood wall was constructed along Water Street (the street that runs along the banks of the Ohio River) in 1982, thus protecting that section of Benwood from the river floods seen in the last three decades (1990, 1991, 1996, 2004, 2005, 2007, 2011, two in 2018, and 2024).

=== South Benwood ===
South Benwood lies below Center Benwood and contains the majority of the city's industrial developments.

=== Boggs Run ===
The Boggs Run area of Benwood contains the land extending from Marshall Street at the mouth of Boggs Run to the confluence of Boggs Run and Browns Run. That portion of land was annexed to the city of Benwood on November 7, 1944. Boggs Run (the creek that runs through the land) is named after John Boggs (1739–1826), who staked his claim to the land surrounding the creek in 1774 and settled there with his family along the creek. In 1798, he sold the land at Boggs Run and moved with most of his family to Pickaway County, Ohio, where he lived the remainder of his life. He is buried in the Boggs Family Cemetery (Elmwood Farm) in Logan Elm Village, Pickaway County, Ohio.

Boggs Run has seen many devastating flash floods through the years, but one of the worst in recent history occurred on August 31, 1975. Other flash floods since 1990 occurred on June 14, 1990; September 17, 2004; July 28, 2017; and June 26, 2025. In the event of an Ohio River Flood, the mouth of Boggs Run is flooded both by the river and the creek, as the river flood backs up the flow of the creek.

=== Outlying areas ===
While the areas of Benwood Hill and a portion of Boggs Run beyond where Browns Run flows into Boggs Run are provided with some services from Benwood's public works, they fall outside the city limits and are not directly parts of the city.

=== Former neighborhoods ===
Harmony Hill was a residential area of Benwood that was located on the hillside between the mouth of Boggs Run and Schad's Crossing (former entrance to the north end of Center Benwood at Fourth Street) along West Virginia Route 2. Kentucky Heights was another residential area located on the hillside along Route 2 between Schad's Crossing at Center Benwood and The Bellaire Bridge. The homes and businesses of both areas were all razed to make way for the relocation of West Virginia Route 2 through the construction of the present four-lane highway in 1966.

== Religion ==
Benwood was once home to three churches of different religious denominations. Of the three churches, two remain in operation.

Saint John Roman Catholic Church

Saint John Roman Catholic Church, located at 622 Main Street in Center Benwood, was officially established as a parish on August 1, 1875, when the first resident pastor, Rev. Patrick F. McKernan, was appointed to serve the Roman Catholic residents of Benwood. Prior to 1875, the original church, which had been constructed about 1868 and was dedicated to Saint John, was served by visiting priests from surrounding parishes. The original church was damaged by a flood of the Ohio River in February 1884. As a result, the church was demolished, and a new church was built on the same site between 1891 and 1892. The cornerstone for the second church was laid on June 28, 1891. The second church, dedicated on January 24, 1892, served the parish for one hundred and twenty-four years until it was destroyed by a fire on Monday, March 30, 2015. The 1891 church, along with the rectory, was demolished between May 2015 and August 2015. Ground was broken for the third Saint John Church on June 28, 2016. The new church was constructed on the same site as the 1891 church. Construction was completed in the summer of 2017. The new church was dedicated on September 9, 2017. The first regular Sunday Mass was celebrated in the new church on September 17, 2017.

The majority of the parish consists of the descendants of immigrants from several different European ethnic groups (Irish, English, Welsh, German, Austrian, Hungarian, Italian, Croatian, Slovak, Czech, Polish, Serbian, and Romanian) who settled in Benwood and the outlying areas of Boggs Run and Browns Run in the mid to late 1800s and early 1900s.

Saint John Church is a parish within the Wheeling Vicariate of the Roman Catholic Diocese of Wheeling-Charleston. Since June 20, 1995, Saint John Church and Saint James Roman Catholic Church in the neighboring city of McMechen have been served by the same pastor.

Saint Matthew Evangelical Lutheran Church

Saint Matthew Lutheran Church is located in Boggs Run on Boggs Run Road just outside the Benwood city limits. The church was formerly located in what is now the Blake Brothers Post No. 46 American Legion building in Center Benwood on Water Street. It was relocated to the present church built on Boggs Run in 1941.

Benwood Methodist Episcopal Church

A Methodist Episcopal (M.E.) Church was formerly located in Center Benwood. The first structure that housed the church was located on Eighth Street. It was later relocated to a new church built on Main Street in 1900, which was razed in the early 1990s.

== Education ==
Benwood was once home to several public schools and two Roman Catholic private schools. Marshall County Schools operates area public schools.

Public Schools

There was a public elementary school in Center Benwood. During the course of its history, three separate buildings housed this school located on Water Street. The first school building was built in the late 1860s and razed to build a larger school in 1873. The second school building was built in 1873 and razed in 1901. The third and final school building was built in 1901. The school closed in 1953, and the building was later razed.

A public elementary school was located in North Benwood and closed in 1953 as well. The Croatian Cultural Club building housed this school.

South Benwood had a public elementary school, but it was destroyed by fire in the early 1910s.

Boggs Run Elementary School is located on Boggs Run Road beyond the Benwood city limits. It was first housed in a wooden structure, but was later replaced with a brick structure on the same site about 1927. The school closed in 1990 at the end of the 1989–1990 school year. The brick school building still stands, and it now houses a Halloween museum.

Union High School, located in South Benwood on Marshall Street, was established in 1913 when Benwood High School was consolidated with McMechen High School. Union operated as a high school (grades 9, 10, 11 and 12) for fifty-five years, from 1913 until the end of the 1967–1968 school year, graduating its last class in 1968. Union High School was consolidated with two other public high schools in Marshall County (Moundsville High School and Sherrard High School, which both became junior high schools and are still in operation) in 1968 to form John Marshall High School in the city of Glen Dale in Marshall County. John Marshall High School opened at the beginning of the 1968–1969 school year and is still in operation. Union then became a junior high school (grades 7, 8 and 9) until it closed in 2003 at the end of the 2002–2003 school year.

Parochial/Private Schools

Saints James and John School was a Roman Catholic elementary and middle school (preschool through eighth grade) that was located on 7th Street in Center Benwood. The origin of Saint John School dated back to 1860. The school, which was connected to the back of Saint John Roman Catholic Church, was housed in several different buildings in the immediate area during the course of its history before a new school was built during 1952–1953 and opened on January 2, 1954. In 1971, Saint John School in Benwood was consolidated with Saint James School in McMechen, and the school became known as Saints James and John School. After the fire that destroyed Saint John Church on March 30, 2015, the school was moved to the former Saint Francis Xavier School in Moundsville, West Virginia (closed in 2012) where the students finished the 2014–2015 school year. On May 18, 2015, it was announced by the Diocese of Wheeling-Charleston that the school would remain in Moundsville. The school would be renamed All Saints Catholic School. All Saints operated for two school years (2015 - 2016 and 2016 - 2017) and was a diocesan school rather than a parish school. It was announced on June 22, 2017, that it would close. All Saints Catholic School served the parishioners of Saint John in Benwood, Saint James in McMechen, Saint Jude in Glen Dale, Saint Francis Xavier in Moundsville, Saint Martin of Tours in Cameron and Saint Joseph in Proctor. Saints James and John School was demolished in August 2015.

Saint Catherine School was a Roman Catholic elementary and middle school (first through eighth grade) that was located on Marshall Street in North Benwood. The school building once stood on the site of the parking lot of the former Pic-Way Shoe Store (later the Payless ShoeSource) on Marshall Street. Before operating as a school, the building was a Roman Catholic parish dedicated to Saint Catherine that operated from 1924 to about 1928 and served a predominantly Croatian congregation. In 1929, a school by the same name was opened in the building and continued to operate until Saint Catherine School closed in 1962 at the end of the 1961–1962 school year. The building was razed in late May 1970.

The majority of the students who attended the former Saint John School in Center Benwood (later Saints James and John School) and the former Saint Catherine School in North Benwood went on to attend high school at Bishop Donahue Memorial High School in McMechen, which was founded in 1955. Bishop Donahue High School closed in 2017 at the end of the 2016 - 2017 school year.

== Mayors ==
The following individuals have served as the mayor of Benwood:

- James L. Brown (1882–1889)
- Joseph Mahood (1889–1895) (1906–1910)
- Thomas Shepard (1895–1904)
- John Manley (1904–1905) (1910–1912)
- John Scanlon (1912–1914)
- Clark Sprouts (1914–1921)
- John Cox (1922–1926)
- Fred M. Olson (1926-1928)
- Leonard M. Morningstar (1928-1930)
- Henry Healy (1930–1936)
- Raphael P. Deegan (1936–1959)
- Henry A. Musilli, Sr. (1959–1962)
- Anthony J. Scaffidi (1962–1996)
- Lawrence C. Ferrera, Jr. (1996–2003)
- Edward M. Kuca, Jr. (2003–2020)
- Walter W. Yates (2020–present)

== Media ==
Benwood is home to WDUQ-LP, a listener supported commercial-free radio station.

== See also ==
- List of cities and towns along the Ohio River
