= Bannen =

Bannen may refer to:

== People ==
- Ian Bannen (1928–1999), Scottish actor
- Kelleigh Bannen, American country music singer

== Places ==
- Bannen, West Virginia, an unincorporated community in Marshall County, United States

== See also ==
- Bannan (disambiguation)
- Bannon, a surname
  - O'Bannon (disambiguation)
