= Wolf Run =

Wolf Run may refer to:

== Ohio ==
- Wolf Run, Ohio, unincorporated community in Jefferson County
- Wolf Run State Park, in Caldwell

== Pennsylvania ==
- Wolf Run (Bowman Creek), in Luzerne County
- Wolf Run (Muncy Creek), in Lycoming County
- Wolf Run (North Branch Mehoopany Creek), in Bradford and Sullivan Counties
- Wolf Run (Tohickon Creek), in Bucks County
- Wolf Run (Sugar Creek tributary), in Venango County
- Wolf Run (Buffalo Creek tributary), in Washington County

== West Virginia ==
- Wolf Run (Tygart Valley River tributary), a stream in Barbour County
- Wolf Run, West Virginia, unincorporated community in Marshall County

== Other uses ==
- Wolfrun, the Japanese name of Ulric, a character in Glitter Force

== See also ==
- Run Wolf Run, 1994 studio album by the Japanese rock band Guitar Wolf
