= Benwood mine disaster =

Coal mine explosion in West Virginia, U.S. in 1924

Coordinates: 40°0.78′N 80°44.05′W

- Date: April 28, 1924
- Location: Wheeling Steel Corporation steel mill located in the city of Benwood in Marshall County, West Virginia
- Cause: Coal mine explosion
- Deaths: 119

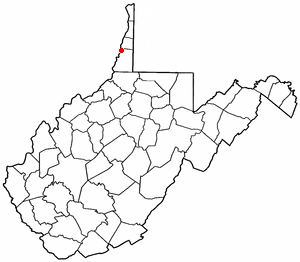
Map showing the location of Benwood in the Northern panhandle of West Virginia

The Benwood Mine Disaster was a coal mine explosion that occurred on Monday, April 28, 1924, at the Benwood Mine of the former Benwood Works of Wheeling Steel Corporation, located in the city of Benwood in Marshall County, West Virginia. The disaster claimed the lives of 119 coal miners. There were no survivors. It is the third-worst coal mining disaster in the state of West Virginia after the Monongah Mine disaster of December 6, 1907, that claimed the lives of 361 miners, and the Eccles Mine Disaster of April 28, 1914, that claimed the lives of 183 miners.

Two explosions were caused by the ignition of methane gas and coal dust. The explosions occurred at approximately 7:05 AM EST that morning, about half an hour after the morning shift of coal miners had entered the mine to begin work.

The majority of the victims were European immigrants of the early 20th Century from Poland, Italy, Greece, Hungary, Croatia, Serbia, Russia, Ukraine, Lithuania, Slovenia, Slovakia, England, Wales, and Scotland. Most of the victims were of the Roman Catholic faith. 71 of the 119 victims were buried in Mount Calvary Cemetery in Wheeling, Ohio County, West Virginia, a Roman Catholic cemetery operated by the Diocese of Wheeling-Charleston. 26 miners who were of the Greek Orthodox, Serbian Orthodox, and various Protestant faiths are buried close by Mount Calvary Cemetery in Wheeling's Greenwood Cemetery.

A memorial for the victims of the 1924 Benwood Mine Disaster was erected at the mouth of Boggs Run along Boggs Run Road/Roosevelt Avenue in Benwood, Marshall County, West Virginia, in 2014. A committee of eight Marshall County, West Virginia, residents known as the Benwood Mine Disaster Memorial Committee was formed in August 2011. Fundraising for the memorial began in 2012. Construction took place between 2013 and 2014. The memorial was formally dedicated on September 27, 2014. A memorial for the five victims of the Hitchman Coal & Coke Company Mine Disaster that also occurred in Benwood on May 18, 1942, is located at the memorial site and was dedicated on the same day.

On September 2, 2019, a memorial was dedicated at the Memorial Site honoring Joseph "Joe" Tellitocci, Jr. (December 31, 1952 - March 15, 2018), who served as the Project Coordinator of the Benwood Mine Disaster Memorial Committee from 2011 until his death in 2018 and was a former Benwood City Councilman from 1982 to 2002. He and his oldest son, Joseph Anthony "Joey" Tellitocci, who served as the Co-Chairman, Treasurer, and Historian of the Committee, were both honored as West Virginia History Heroes in 2015 at the state capitol in Charleston, West Virginia, for their efforts in establishing the memorial.
