= Bannan =

Bannan is a surname and may refer to:

- Barry Bannan (born 1989), Scottish international footballer (Aston Villa, Crystal Palace)
- Josh Bannan (born 2001), Australian basketball player
- Justin Bannan (born 1979), American football defensive tackle
- Sarah Bannan, author of Weightless
- Tommy Bannan (1930–2004), Scottish footballer
- Bannan Line, Blue Line of Taipei Metro

== Television ==
- Bannan (TV series) is a Scottish Gaelic television series

== See also ==
- Bannen (disambiguation)
- Bannon, a surname
