= Alvena Sečkar =

American painter and children's book author

- Born: March 1, 1916; McMechen, West Virginia, U.S.
- Died: March 18, 2012 (aged 96); Pompton Lakes, New Jersey
- Education: William Allen High School; Kline-Baum Art School; University of Pennsylvania; New York University; Institut d'Art et d'Archéologie
- Occupations: Painter; Children's author Social activist

Alvena Vajda Sečkar (March 1, 1916 – March 8, 2012) was an American painter, children's book author, and social activist. The child of Slovak immigrants to the United States, much of her work deals with the immigrant experience in Appalachian coal mining towns.

Alvena Sečkar was born on March 1, 1916 in McMechen, West Virginia. Her father Valentine Sečkar was from Ružindol and her mother Susan "Zuzi" Vadjdak was from Orava. Her family moved frequently and her schooling was sporadic until her mother left her father due to his alcoholism, eventually settling in Allentown, Pennsylvania in 1929 and opening a small restaurant at 127 Allen Street in Allentown.

== Early life and education ==
Sečkar attended William Allen High School and Kline-Baum Art School in Allentown, Pennsylvania. She attended the University of Pennsylvania but transferred to New York University, graduating in 1939. That summer, she earned a scholarship to study at the Institut d'Art et d'Archéologie in Paris, then went on a trip to Russia.

== Career ==
When World War II began in September 1939, Sečkar returned to the United States via the Netherlands. From 1941 to 1942, she served as the Assistant Keeper for Textiles at the Cooper Union Museum. During the 1940s, she had one-woman shows in New York City and Pittsburg. She earned a master's degree from NYU in 1949.

In the 1950s, Sečkar failed to become a book illustrator, so she began writing her own children's books, depicting the poverty and danger of her childhood experience. In 1952, the New York Times named her book Zuska of the Burning Hills one of the "hundred best books published for children. Her other books were Mischko and Trapped in the Old Mine.

Sečkar saw herself as a political artist and throughout her life devoted artistic and personal effort to a variety of causes. At NYU, she created posters in support of the Abraham Lincoln Brigade. In the 1980s, she sent a painting to Cesar Chavez of his mother's childhood church, the Mission San Xavier del Bac, and he proudly hung it in his office. Her painting of an African-American girl being driven to school amidst anti-desegregation protests is in the National Civil Rights Museum in New Orleans.

Sečkar spent the rest of her life in Pompton Lakes, New Jersey, where she became a local fixture and where May 24 was designated "Alvena Seckar Day" in the town. She developed multiple sclerosis in 1964 and, in 1974, began using a wheelchair. When she lost use of her right arm, she learned to paint left-handed. In 1986, Newsweek named her one of America's 100 "unsung heroes".
