= Alley Grove, West Virginia =

Unincorporated community in West Virginia, United States

Alley Grove
- Unincorporated community
- Location within the state of West Virginia Alley Grove (the United States)
- Coordinates: 39°57′39″N 80°31′34″W
- Country: United States
- State: West Virginia
- County: Marshall
- Elevation: 833 ft (254 m)
- Time zone: UTC-5 (Eastern (EST))
  - Summer (DST): UTC-4 (EDT)
- GNIS ID: 1553713

Alley Grove is an unincorporated community in Marshall County, West Virginia, United States.
