= Natrium (disambiguation) =

Natrium is the Latin name of sodium.

Natrium may also refer to:

- Chrysler Natrium, a hydrogen fuel cell vehicle
- Natrium, West Virginia
- Natrium reactor, a nuclear reactor design by TerraPower
