= Eugen Horniak =

Czechoslovak basketball player (1926–2004)

Personal information
- Born: August 28, 1926 Ružindol, Czechoslovakia
- Died: October 6, 2004 (aged 78) Bratislava, Slovakia

Eugen Horniak, or Evžen Horňák (August 28, 1926 – October 6, 2004) was a Czechoslovak/Slovak basketball player who competed in the 1952 Summer Olympics.

== Life and career ==
Horniak was born in Ružindol. He was part of the Czechoslovak basketball team, which was eliminated in the first round of the 1952 Olympic tournament. He played all three matches.

He later became a physician and worked as a sports medicine doctor at Comenius University in Bratislava. He died in Bratislava in 2004.
