= Charles Lively =

Charles Lively may refer to:

- Charles Lively (athlete) (1893–1971), British long and triple jumper
- Charles Elson Lively (1890–1968), American sociologist
- Charles Lively (labor spy) (1887–1962), American labor spy
