= Mount Olivet, West Virginia =

Mount Olivet is the name of several unincorporated communities in the U.S. state of West Virginia:

- Mount Olivet, Marshall County, West Virginia
- Mount Olivet, Preston County, West Virginia
