= Blair Bridge =

Blair Bridge may refer to:

- Blair Bridge (New Hampshire), across the Pemigewasset River, near Campton, New Hampshire, US
- Blair Bridge (Union Pacific Railroad), across the Missouri River, near Blair, Nebraska, US
- Blair Bridge (U.S. Route 30), across the Missouri River, near Blair, Nebraska, US, also known as the Abraham Lincoln Memorial Bridge
- a bridge on Washington State Route 509, demolished in the 1990s

== See also ==
- Blairs Ridge
