= Cresap =

Cresap may refer to:

== People ==
- Michael Cresap (1742–1775), British American frontiersman
- Thomas Cresap (1702–1790), English colonial settler in Maryland

== Places ==
- Cresap, West Virginia, United States, an unincorporated community

== See also ==
- Cresap's War, 1730–1767
- Cresaptown, Maryland, United States, a census-designated place
