= Flaugherty Run =

Physical characteristics
- Source
  - location: north of the intersection of Spring Run Rd. Ext. and Flaugherty Run Rd. in Moon Township, Allegheny County, Pennsylvania
  - elevation: about 1,075 ft (328 m)
- Mouth
  - location: Ohio River near the intersection of Ferry St. and Front St. in Crescent, Allegheny County, Pennsylvania
  - coordinates: 40°33′27″N 80°13′03″W
  - elevation: 682 ft (208 m)
- Length: 4.3 mi (6.9 km)
- Basin size: 8.86 mi^{2} (22.9 km^{2})

Basin features
- Progression: Ohio River → Mississippi River + Gulf of Mexico

Flaugherty Run is a tributary of the Ohio River in Allegheny County, Pennsylvania, in the United States. It is approximately 4.3 miles (6.9 km) long and flows through Moon Township, Allegheny County, Pennsylvania and Crescent, Pennsylvania. The watershed of the stream has an area of 8.86 square miles (22.9 km^{2}).

== Course ==
Flaugherty Run begins in Moon Township, generally following Flaugherty Run Rd. and then McGovern Blvd. It flows northeast and reaches its confluence with the Ohio River at the Glenwillard Boat Club in Glenwillard.

=== Tributaries ===
Flaugherty Run has several named tributaries. In order from source to mouth, they are Becks Run, Boggs Run, and Spring Run. It also has several unnamed tributaries.

== Geography and geology ==
The elevation near the mouth of Flaugherty Run is 682 feet (208 m) above sea level. The elevation of the stream's source is about 1,075 feet (328 m) above sea level.

== Watershed ==
The watershed of Flaugherty Run has an area of 8.86 square miles (22.9 km^{2}).

== History ==
At one point, Flaugherty Run crosses Brodhead Road, a road originally created by and subsequently named after General Daniel Brodhead when travelling between Fort Pitt (Pennsylvania) and Fort McIntosh (Pennsylvania) during the American Revolutionary War. During the war, a soldier that stood post at the stream for several weeks died. The soldier's name was Flaugherty, and the stream was thusly named. Flaugherty Run was entered into the Geographic Names Information System on August 2, 1979. Its identifier in the Geographic Names Information System is 1188258.

== See also ==
- List of rivers of Pennsylvania
