= Spring Run (Ohio River tributary) =

Physical characteristics
- Source
  - location: near Brodhead Rd. in Crescent, Allegheny County, Pennsylvania
  - elevation: between 1,000 and 1,040 feet (300 and 320 m)
- Mouth
  - location: Flaugherty Run in Crescent, Allegheny County, Pennsylvania
  - coordinates: 40°33′22″N 80°13′12″W
  - elevation: 692 ft (211 m)
- Length: 1.2 mi (1.9 km)
- Basin size: 0.4 mi^{2} (1.0 km^{2})

Basin features
- Progression: Flaugherty Run → Ohio River → Mississippi River + Gulf of Mexico

Spring Run is a tributary of Flaugherty Run in Allegheny County, Pennsylvania, in the United States. It is approximately 1.2 miles (1.9 km) long and flows through Crescent, Pennsylvania. The watershed of the stream has an area of 0.4 square miles (1.0 km^{2}).

== Course ==
Spring Run begins in Crescent, near Brodhead Road. It flows northeast and reaches its confluence with Flaugherty Run.

Spring Run joins Flaugherty Run 650 feet (200 m) upstream of its mouth.

=== Tributaries ===
Spring Run has no named tributaries. However, it does have an unnamed tributary which joins Spring Run about halfway down its length.

== Geography and geology ==
The elevation near the mouth of Spring Run is 692 feet (211 m) above sea level. The elevation of the stream's source is between 1,000 and 1,040 feet (300 and 320 m) above sea level.

== Watershed ==
The watershed of Spring Run has an area of 0.4 square miles (1.0 km^{2}).

== History ==
Spring Run was entered into the Geographic Names Information System on August 2, 1979. Its identifier in the Geographic Names Information System is 1188258.

== See also ==
- Boggs Run, next tributary of Flaugherty Run going upstream
- List of rivers of Pennsylvania
