= McKeefrey, West Virginia =

McKeefrey
- Unincorporated community
- Location within the state of West Virginia McKeefrey (the United States)
- Coordinates: 39°53′36″N 80°47′22″W
- Country: United States
- State: West Virginia
- County: Marshall
- Elevation: 689 ft (210 m)
- Time zone: UTC-5 (Eastern (EST))
  - Summer (DST): UTC-4 (EDT)
- GNIS ID: 1555087

McKeefrey is an unincorporated community in Marshall County, West Virginia, United States. It was also known as Round Bottom and Chestnut Hill.

The community was named after one Mr. Keefrey, the proprietor of a local mine.
