= T. S. Denison =

American writer and educator (1848–1911)

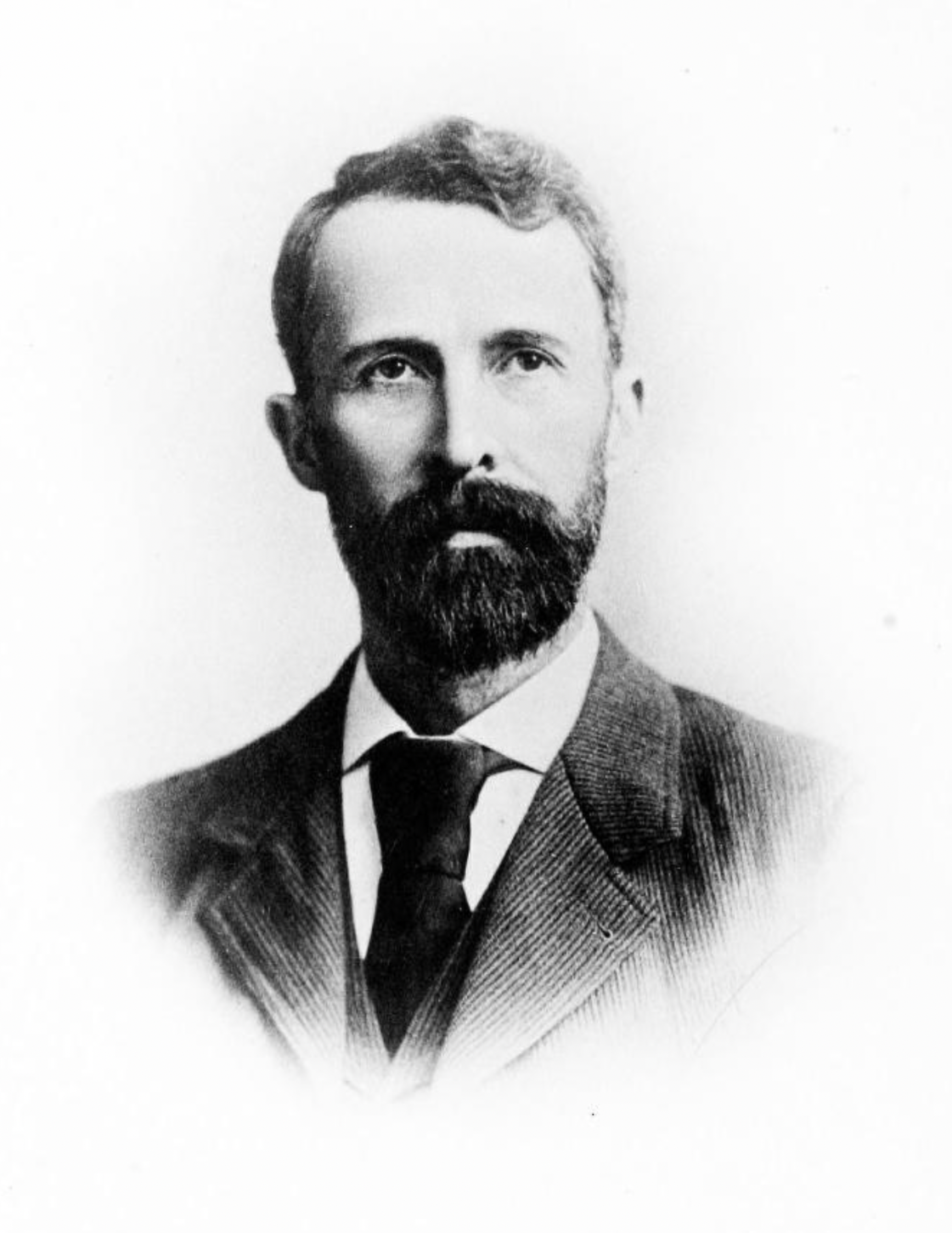
Thomas Stewart Denison

Thomas Stewart Denison (February 20, 1848 – April 8, 1911) was an American playwright, novelist, publisher, and educator. In 1876 he founded the publishing company T. S. Denison & Company in Chicago. During his lifetime this company became one of the largest American publishers of theatrical works such as plays, vaudeville sketches, minstrel show materials, and poetry intended for public performance. Most of the material published by the company were not intended for professional use but were targeted towards amateur performance such as community theatre, school theatre groups, or church groups. After his death the company continued to operate in Chicago until 1943 when it moved to Minneapolis. The company's focus shifted away from theatre to education materials in the 20th century after Denison's death.

== Life and career ==
An example of Denison's Blackface Series.

The son of Alexander McCoy Denison and Esther Stewart Denison, Thomas Stewart Denison was born in Sand Hill, Marshall County, West Virginia (at the time still part of Virginia) on February 20, 1848. He began his career as an educator, and in the 1870s he was principal of first Turner Schools and then Marengo Schools in Illinois. He resided in Chicago for most of his life; moving to the city from Dekalb, Illinois after briefly serving as a school principal there following his post in Marengo.

Denison founded the Chicago publishing firm T. S. Denison & Company (TSDC) in 1876 at premises located at 70 Metropolitan Block. In terms of the volume of sales, the company grew to become one of the largest American publishers of theatrical material such as plays, monologues, comedies, vaudeville sketches, dialogues, and poetry readings during the late 19th and early 20th centuries. Most of the materials published were not intended for professional use, but were targeted toward community theatre organizations, schools groups, and church organizations for amateur performance. Denison created a formula for the company's plays which included the consistent use of happy endings, a topical but not too political focus (such as a morality play, a religious play, a temperance play, a patriotic play, etc.) a single interior scene, and a limited number of characters; all of which made plays easy to produce for amateurs.

TSDC moved from its original location to other addresses in Chicago; including 163 West Randolph St, 152 West Randolph St, and finally 623 South Wabash Avenue. Denison used TSDC to publish both his own creations and those written by others with TSDC having a group of its own in-house playwrights in addition to accepting and soliciting outside submissions. Cheaply printed, most of the publications sold for between 15 cents and 25 cents per copy. TSDC distributed its works through field agents and catalogues rather than in stores, and it organized its publications into several series. These series included The Alta Series, Amateur Series, The Amateur Stage, Friday Afternoon Series, The Star Drama, and Wide-Awake Dialogues.

The TSDC organization was one of the main publishers of minstrel show materials. The company's association with this material was so well known that Princeton University historian Rhae Lynn Barnes stated that Denison was "synonymous with minstrelsy". Some examples of works featuring blackface minstrelsy published by the TSDC while Denison was alive include Charles Townsend's Negro Minstrels with End Men's Jokes, Gags, Speeches, Etc. (1891), Harry L. Newton's anthology A Bundle of Burnt Cork Anthology (1905), and Denison's own play The Kansas Immigrants, Or The Great Exodus (1907). The company not only sold publications of plays using blackface, but also sold wigs and makeup for the staging of such works. In 1950 alone (long after Denison's death and after the pinnacle of minstrelsy's popularity) TSDC sold 5,000 wigs for minstrel show productions.

As a playwright Denison capitalized on topics of societal importance such as the temperance movement in the United States. He penned several temperance works that were widely distributed in America, among them The Sparkling Cup (1877), Hard Cider: A Temperance Sketch (1880), and Only Cold Tea (1895). Despite penning some pro-temperance plays to meet the demands of the market, Denison was not necessarily personally a believer in the temperance movement himself. The mixed-race protagonist in his play, Patsy O'Wang (1895), embraces the drinking of whiskey enthusiastically in order to symbolically embrace the Irish side of his ancestry over the Chinese (tea drinking) side of his Chinese ancestry. This play, intended for use in vaudeville, was unique for the period in that while it did include yellowface and racial stereotypes, it presented positive possibilities for its mix-raced protagonist in American politics at a time when such individuals were widely shunned and miscegenation was a crime.

In 1895 TSDS published an anthology of Denison's play, Lively Plays for Lively People, which included his plays Topp's Twins, Patsy O'Wang, Rejected, The New Woman, Only Cold Tea, A First-Class Hotel, Madam Princeton's Temple of Beauty, A Dude In a Cyclone, It's All in the Pay Streak, and The Cobbler. Dennison novel The Iron Crown (1985) was a commentary on American journalism. Near the end of his life Denison stopped writing plays and instead worked on several pseudo-science books on linguistics.

Having never married, Denison died in Hot Springs, Arkansas on April 8, 1911. He was still operating TSDC at the time of his death. Eben Norris inherited the firm in Denison's will. Norris continued to operate TSDC until his death in 1943. The company was then acquired by Lawrence M. Brings who relocated TSDC to Minneapolis and reoriented the publishing house towards educational materials.

== Partial list of works written by Denison ==
=== Non-fiction ===
- How Not to Write a Play (1904)
- Mexican in Aryan Phonology (1907)
- The Primitive Aryans of America (1908)
- A Mexican-Aryan Comparative Vocabulary (1909)
- Morphology of the Mexican Verb (1910)
- Mexican-Aryan Sibilants (1912)
- Mexican Linguistics: Including Nauatl Or Mexican in Aryan Phonology; The Primitive Aryans of America; A Mexican-Aryan Comparative Vocabulary; Morphology and the Mexican Verb; and The Mexican-Aryan Sibilants; with an Appendix on Comparative Syntax (1913)

=== Novels ===
- Iron Crown: A Tale of the Great Republic (1885)
- My Invisible Partner (1898)
- Man Behind: A Novel (1899)

=== Plays ===
- A Family Strike (1877)
- Initiating a Granger (1877)
- The Irish Linen Peddler (1877)
- Seth Greenback (1877)
- The Sparkling Cup (1877)
- Wanted: A Correspondant (1877)
- Borrowing Trouble (1878)
- Louva, the Pauper (1878)
- Hans von Smash (1878)
- Two Ghosts in White (1878)
- Odds With the Enemy (1879)
- Is the Editor In? (1879)
- An Only Daughter (1879)
- Hard Cider: A Temperance Sketch (1880)
- Pets of Society (1880)
- Under the Laurels (1881)
- The Danger Signal (1883)
- Wide Enough for Two (1883)
- Only Cold Tea (1895)
- Patsy O'Wang (1895)
- The Great Doughnut Corporation (1903)
- The Kansas Immigrants, Or The Great Exodus (1907)
