= Sherrard, West Virginia =

- Unincorporated community
- Location within West Virginia Location within the United States
- Coordinates: 39°59′14″N 80°40′33″W
- Country: United States
- State: West Virginia
- County: Marshall
- Elevation: 1,299 ft (396 m)
- Time zone: UTC-5 (Eastern (EST))
  - Summer (DST): UTC-4 (EDT)
- Area codes: 304 & 681
- GNIS feature ID: 1546678

Sherrard is an unincorporated community in Marshall County, West Virginia, United States. Sherrard is located on West Virginia Route 88, 3 miles (4.8 km) east of McMechen. It is named for politician and lawyer Sherrard Clemens.
