= Woodlands, West Virginia =

Woodlands
- Unincorporated community
- Location within the state of West Virginia Woodlands (the United States)
- Coordinates: 39°48′24″N 80°49′1″W
- Country: United States
- State: West Virginia
- County: Marshall
- Elevation: 640 ft (200 m)
- Time zone: UTC-5 (Eastern (EST))
  - Summer (DST): UTC-4 (EDT)
- GNIS ID: 1556020

Woodlands is an unincorporated community in Marshall County, West Virginia, United States. It was also known as Sisters Landing.
