= Banon =

Banon may refer to:

- Banon cheese, French cheese
- Banon, Alpes-de-Haute-Provence, a commune in the Alpes-de-Haute-Provence department in France
- Characters of Final Fantasy VI#Banon, a character in Final Fantasy VI
- Tristane Banon, a French writer and journalist

== See also ==
- Bannon
