= Adaline, West Virginia =

Unincorporated community in West Virginia, United States

Adaline
- Unincorporated community
- Location within the state of West Virginia Adaline (the United States)
- Coordinates: 39°45′55″N 80°38′47″W
- Country: United States
- State: West Virginia
- County: Marshall
- Elevation: 787 ft (240 m)
- Time zone: UTC-5 (Eastern (EST))
  - Summer (DST): UTC-4 (EDT)
- GNIS ID: 1553693

Adaline is an unincorporated community in Marshall County, West Virginia, United States. Adaline is located along Fish Creek.
