= Mozart, West Virginia =

Mozart
- Unincorporated community
- Location within the state of West Virginia Mozart (the United States)
- Coordinates: 40°01′56″N 80°42′53″W
- Country: United States
- State: West Virginia
- County: Ohio, Marshall
- Time zone: UTC-5 (Eastern (EST))
  - Summer (DST): UTC-4 (EDT)

Mozart is an unincorporated community in Marshall and Ohio counties in the U.S. state of West Virginia. It lies at an elevation of 1,260 feet (384 m).
