= Captina, West Virginia =

Unincorporated community in West Virginia, United States

Captina
- Unincorporated community
- Location within the state of West Virginia Captina (the United States)
- Coordinates: 39°49′8″N 80°48′47″W
- Country: United States
- State: West Virginia
- County: Marshall
- Elevation: 666 ft (203 m)
- Time zone: UTC-5 (Eastern (EST))
  - Summer (DST): UTC-4 (EDT)
- GNIS ID: 1554068

Captina is an unincorporated community in Marshall County, West Virginia, United States. It was also known as Caapteenin, Capteener, Capteening and Woco.

The community most likely takes its name from nearby Captina Creek.
