= Charles Elson Lively =

American rural sociologist

- Born: September 29, 1890; Marshall County, West Virginia, U.S.
- Died: December 28, 1968 (aged 78); Columbia, Missouri, U.S.

Academic background
- Education: University of Nebraska (MA) (BA); University of Minnesota (PhD)

Academic work
- Discipline: Sociology
- Sub-discipline: Rural Sociology
- Institutions: Ohio State University; University of Missouri

Charles Elson Lively (September 29, 1890 – December 28, 1968) was an American sociologist and among the early pioneers in rural sociology. He conducted research into rural habits and ways of life in rural communities throughout the midwest, though most of his work focused on Ohio and Missouri. As Brunner notes in The Growth of a Science: A Half Century of Rural Sociological Research in the United States, Lively's work was instrumental in demonstrating the regionality of social conditions. Lively was among the first sociologists to empirically demonstrate variability in social factors as a useful metric in defining regions, rather than using biophysical characteristics (soil quality, farm types, etc.) alone. During his tenure at the University of Missouri, he became increasingly interested in rural healthcare and demographics. Lively was president of the Rural Sociological Society from 1942 to 1943. Later in life, the State of Missouri awarded him the W. Scott Johnson Award for his work in rural areas of the state.

== Early life ==
Little is known or published of Lively's early life. He was born on September 29, 1890, in Marshall County, West Virginia. As a young adult, he received his Bachelor's of Arts and Master of Arts from the University of Nebraska in 1917 and 1918, respectively.

== Career ==
Lively worked as an instructor at the University of Minnesota from 1919 to 1931. In 1931, he took a job as a professor of rural economics at Ohio State University. In 1925, Lively was admitted to the American Association of University Professors, and in 1931 he was awarded his PhD. During his tenure at the University of Minnesota, Lively completed his first major published study, Growth and Decline of Farm Trade Centers in Minnesota, 1905–1930. This work examined the shifting of rural populations in relation to their town centers, and how those centers relate to standards of living on farms. He found that the number of smallest towns (under 500 persons) was declining, while that of the larger ones (up to 2,500 persons) was increasing. Additionally, Lively found that legal incorporation and listing on paper maps (IE Rand McNally Atlas) was a significant factor in growth for agricultural trade centers.

As a professor of rural economics at Ohio State, Lively published over a dozen reports on rural Ohio. These ranged from studies into the mobility patterns of young adults in rural communities, to the economic state of agricultural counties. This work was especially important given the upheaval of the Great Depression. So important were Lively's works on rural economics and sociology, that he was a founding member of the Rural Sociological Society.

As part of his work in demographics, Lively explored rates of survival and migration surrounding rural communities. Rural Migration in the United States, published in 1939, was conducted in cooperation with Conrad Taeuber of the United States Department of Agriculture (who would go on to become an influential demographer and sociologist in his own right), and at the request of the Works Progress Administration as part of the Second New Deal, studied the effects of the Great Depression on rural growth and migration patterns for the purposes of providing assistance to those communities. Lively developed methods of measuring rural migration phenomena that have been widely used and referenced by rural researchers. He can be credited with fostering an understanding of patterns of migration, and spatial relationships between rural areas and metropolitan centers. Lively deeply explored the idea that social patterns and organizations had a significant effect on the evolution of rural communities, and the effect of farming technology on families and communities. Of unique importance was who migrated from rural areas to urban areas, and whether those individuals were more or less desirable.

In 1938, Lively took a job as professor and head of the Department of Rural Sociology at the University of Missouri, a post he retained until his retirement in 1961. There, he expanded the departmental offerings and emphasized research, hiring many professors as a result.

== Awards and recognition ==
- President Elect, Rural Sociological Society: 1942–1943
- W Scott Johnson Award (in honor of distinguished service to public health in the State of Missouri) State of Missouri: 1961
- Charles E. Lively Student Loan Fund, University of Missouri. Given to graduate students or junior or senior undergraduates studying Rural Sociology at the University of Missouri
- Fellow, American Association of for the Advancement of Science; Secretary of Advisory Council on Human Relations: 1939–1945
- Member, American Sociological Society, Executive Committee: 1943–1946

== Selected works ==
- Growth and Decline of Farm Trade Centers in Minnesota: 1905–1930 (July, 1932)
- Rural Migration in the United States (June, 1939)
- The Growth Cycle of the Family Farm (October 1932)
- The Rural Population Resources of Missouri (November, 1948)
- Farm Youth in Missouri (June, 1947)

== Personal life ==
Lively was married to Ethel Dell Johnston.
