= Big Run, Marshall County, West Virginia =

Unincorporated community in West Virginia, United States

Big Run
- Unincorporated community
- Location within the state of West Virginia Big Run (the United States)
- Coordinates: 39°47′52″N 80°33′25″W
- Country: United States
- State: West Virginia
- County: Marshall
- Time zone: UTC-5 (Eastern (EST))
  - Summer (DST): UTC-4 (EDT)

Big Run is an unincorporated community on U.S. Route 250 in Marshall County, West Virginia, United States.
