= Cameron High School (West Virginia) =

Location
- 2012 Blue and Gold Road; Cameron, West Virginia 26033; United States
- Coordinates: 39.8485°N 80.5544°W

Information
- Type: Public high school
- School district: Marshall County Schools
- Superintendent: Shelby Haines
- CEEB code: 490190
- Principal: Wyatt O'Neil
- Teaching staff: 36.87 (FTE)
- Grades: 6-12
- Student to teacher ratio: 7.89
- Campus type: Distant Rural
- Colors: Navy and Gold
- Athletics conference: Ohio Valley Athletic Conference
- Team name: Dragons
- National ranking: 1
- Test average: 67%
- Website: chs.mars.k12.wv.us

Cameron High School is a public high school in Cameron, West Virginia, United States. It is one of two high schools in the Marshall County Schools. Athletic teams compete as the Cameron Dragons in the West Virginia Secondary School Activities Commission as a member of the Ohio Valley Athletic Conference.
