= McMechen Lockmaster Houses on the Ohio River =

Historic houses in West Virginia, United States

- U.S. National Register of Historic Places
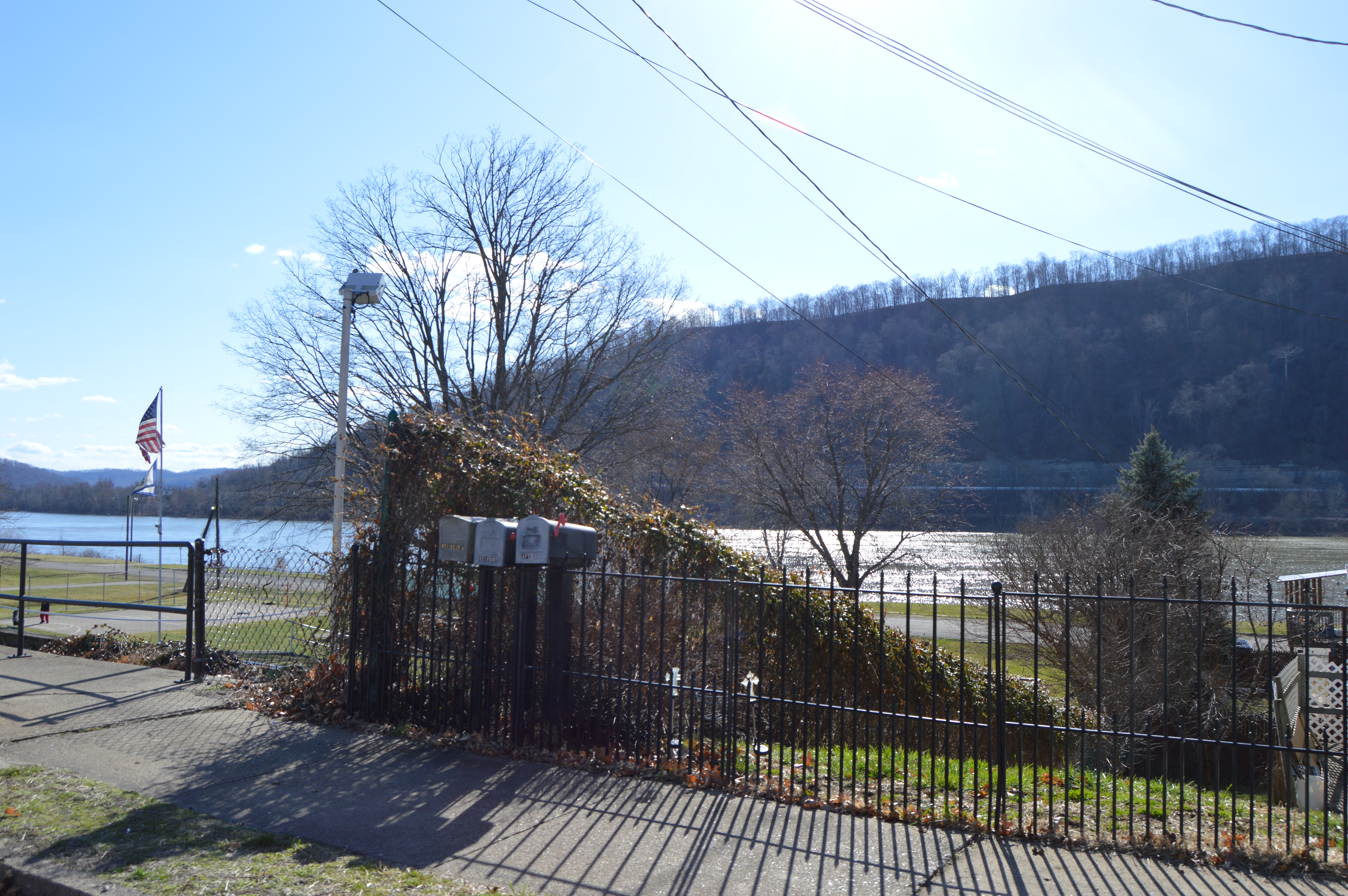
- Site of the houses, now destroyed

- Location within West Virginia Location within the United States
- Location: 623-625 Grant St., McMechen, West Virginia
- Coordinates: 39°59′21″N 80°44′4″W
- Area: 1 acre (0.40 ha)
- Built: 1910
- Architectural style: Tudor Revival
- NRHP reference No.: 92001485
- Added to NRHP: November 12, 1992

The McMechen Lockmaster Houses on the Ohio River, also known as the Ohio River Lock & Dam No. 13, were a set of two historic homes located at McMechen, Marshall County, West Virginia. They were built by the Army Corps of Engineers in 1910, to house the lockmaster's family and engineer. They were set side by side and are mirror images of each other. They were 2½ stories high, with a brick first floor and aggregate stucco above in the Tudor Revival style. They feature vertical wood half-timbering, angled on the gable ends.

They were listed on the National Register of Historic Places in 1992.
