= Beryl Richmond =

American baseball player (1907–1980)

- Pitcher
- Born: August 24, 1907; Glen Easton, West Virginia, U.S.
- Died: April 24, 1980 (aged 72); Cameron, West Virginia, U.S.
- Batted: Both Threw: Left

MLB debut
- April 21, 1933, for the Chicago Cubs

Last MLB appearance
- September 29, 1934, for the Cincinnati Reds

MLB statistics
- Win–loss record: 1–2
- Earned run average: 3.38
- Strikeouts: 11
- Stats at Baseball Reference

Teams
- Chicago Cubs (1933); Cincinnati Reds (1934)

Beryl Justice Richmond (August 24, 1907 – April 24, 1980) was a pitcher in Major League Baseball. He played for the Chicago Cubs and Cincinnati Reds during parts of the 1933 and 1934 seasons. Richmond's contract was sold by Baltimore (International) to the Chicago Cubs on January 11, 1933. When Richmond played with the Reds in 1934, he was one of three players (Junie Barnes and Sherman Edwards were the other two) who were not assigned a uniform number. He is buried at Highland Cemetery, in Cameron, West Virginia.
