= Lynn Camp, West Virginia =

Lynn Camp
- Unincorporated community
- Location within the state of West Virginia Lynn Camp (the United States)
- Coordinates: 39°46′12″N 80°42′26″W
- Country: United States
- State: West Virginia
- County: Marshall
- Elevation: 712 ft (217 m)
- Time zone: UTC-5 (Eastern (EST))
  - Summer (DST): UTC-4 (EDT)
- GNIS ID: 1542632

Lynn Camp is an unincorporated community in Marshall County, West Virginia, United States.
