= Pleasant Valley, Marshall County, West Virginia =

Pleasant Valley
- Unincorporated community
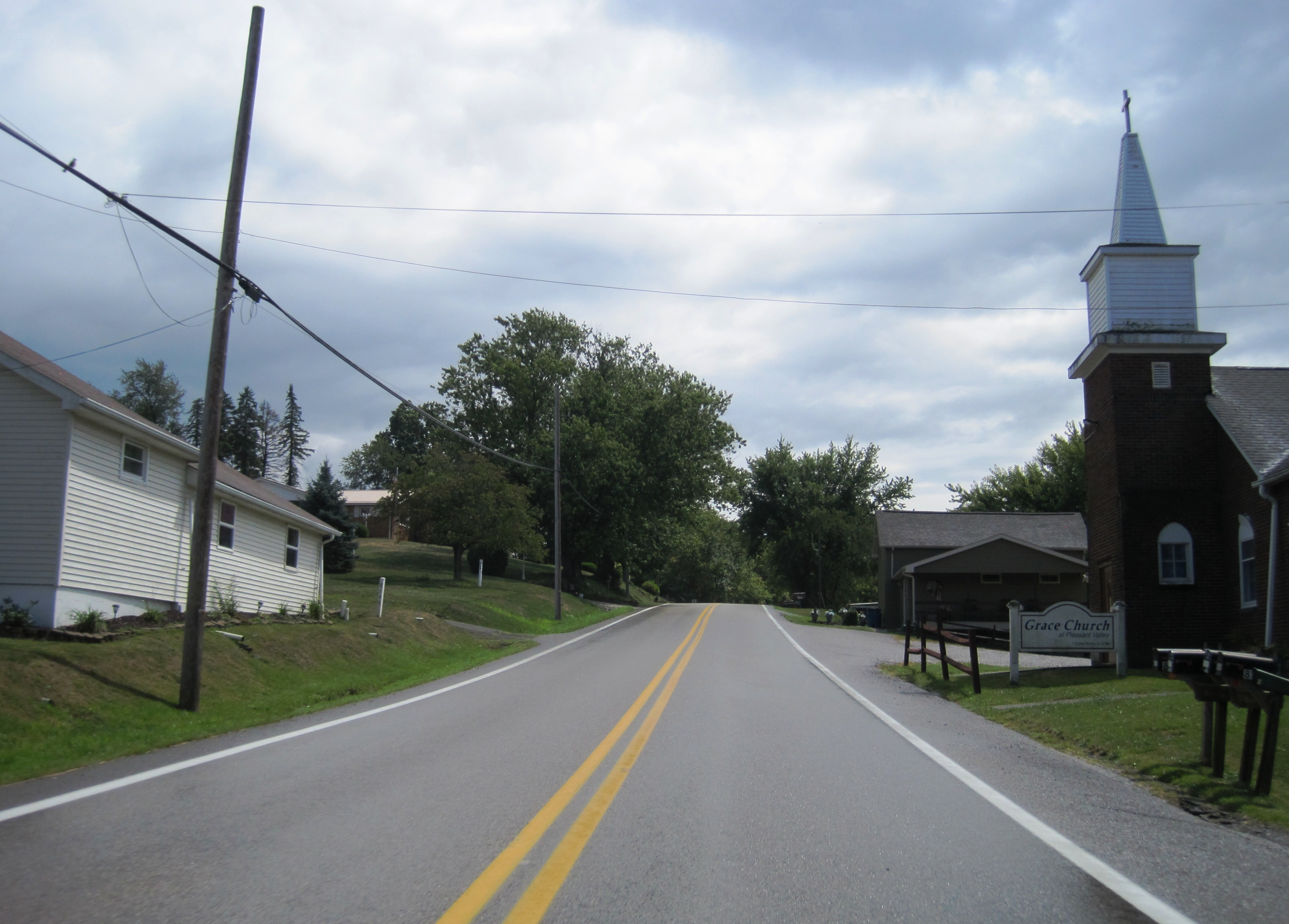
- Southbound US 250 in Pleasant Valley

- Location within the state of West Virginia Pleasant Valley (the United States)
- Coordinates: 39°55′0″N 80°37′34″W
- Country: United States
- State: West Virginia
- County: Marshall
- Elevation: 1,306 ft (398 m)
- Time zone: UTC-5 (Eastern (EST))
  - Summer (DST): UTC-4 (EDT)
- GNIS ID: 1545022

Pleasant Valley is an unincorporated community in Marshall County, West Virginia, United States. It was also known as Beeler Station.

The name is commendatory.
