= Rocklick, West Virginia =

Rocklick
- Unincorporated community
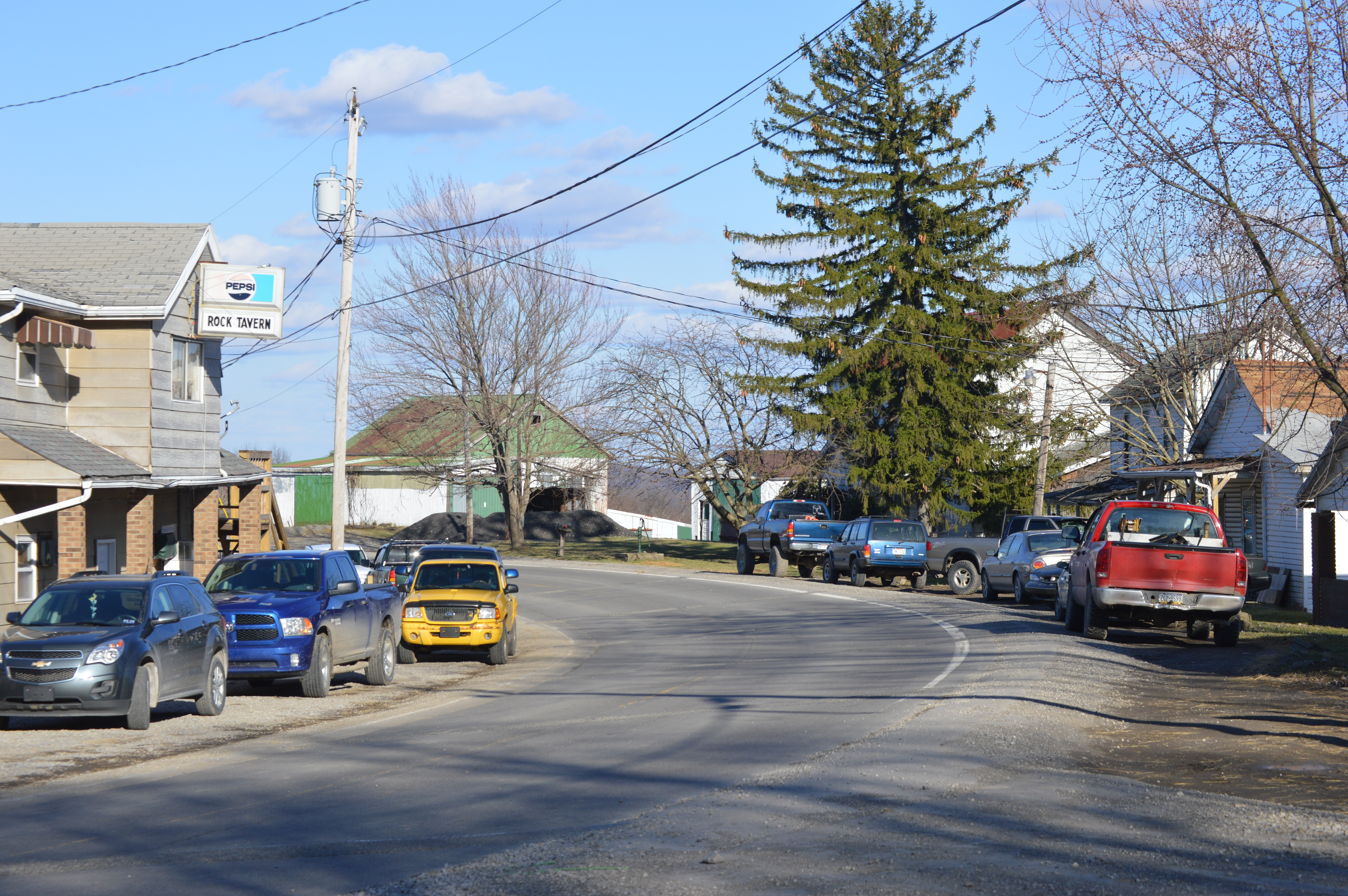
- Scene along West Virginia Route 891

- Location within the state of West Virginia Rocklick (the United States)
- Coordinates: 39°52′23″N 80°31′37″W
- Country: United States
- State: West Virginia
- County: Marshall
- Elevation: 1,476 ft (450 m)
- Time zone: UTC-5 (Eastern (EST))
  - Summer (DST): UTC-4 (EDT)
- GNIS ID: 1555506

Rocklick or Rock Lick is an unincorporated community in Marshall County, West Virginia, United States.
