= Kent, West Virginia =

Kent
- Unincorporated community
- Location within the state of West Virginia Kent (the United States)
- Coordinates: 39°45′59″N 80°51′40″W
- Country: United States
- State: West Virginia
- County: Marshall
- Elevation: 653 ft (199 m)
- Time zone: UTC-5 (Eastern (EST))
  - Summer (DST): UTC-4 (EDT)
- GNIS ID: 1554863

Kent is an unincorporated community in Marshall County, West Virginia, United States.
