= Glen Easton, West Virginia =

Unincorporated community in West Virginia, United States

Glen Easton
- Unincorporated community
- Location within the state of West Virginia Glen Easton (the United States)
- Coordinates: 39°50′0″N 80°38′53″W
- Country: United States
- State: West Virginia
- County: Marshall
- Time zone: UTC-5 (Eastern (EST))
  - Summer (DST): UTC-4 (EDT)
- ZIP codes: 26039

Glen Easton is an unincorporated community in southern Marshall County, West Virginia, United States. It lies along local roads southeast of the city of Moundsville, the county seat of Marshall County. Its elevation is 945 feet (288 m). It has a post office with the ZIP code 26039.

The community was named after the local Easton family.

In 1879, the village was reported to have two dry goods stores, a shoe shop, a gristmill, and a post office.

== Notable person ==
- Beryl Richmond, baseball player.
