= John Marshall High School (West Virginia) =

Location
- 1300 Wheeling Avenue; Glen Dale, West Virginia 26038; United States
- 39.94166°N 80.75334°W

Information
- Type: Public high school
- Established: 1968
- School district: Marshall County School District
- Teaching staff: 93.25 (FTE)
- Grades: 9-12
- Student to teacher ratio: 11.24
- Campus type: Suburban
- Colors: Brown and Gold
- Athletics conference: Ohio Valley Athletic Conference
- Mascot: The Monarch
- Team name: Monarchs
- Rival: Wheeling Park Patriots
- Website: johnmarshallhs.com

John Marshall High School is a public high school in Glen Dale, West Virginia, United States. It is one of two high schools in the Marshall County School District. Athletic teams compete as the John Marshall Monarchs in the WVSSAC Class AAA, as well as the Ohio Valley Athletic Conference.

== Background ==
Named after John Marshall, the fourth Chief Justice of the United States, the school was established in 1968 as a result of the consolidation of three smaller schools in Marshall County, West Virginia: Moundsville High School, Union High School and Sherrard High School. At its inception, John Marshall boasted one of the few modular scheduling systems in the United States. In the 1994-1995 school year, John Marshall High School ran a traditional eight period day offering students half-credit one-semester courses and full-credit two-semester courses.

The student body of John Marshall High School numbers over 1,200 in grades 9 through 12, making it one of the largest secondary schools in West Virginia. The curriculum is comprehensive, including a county-wide vocational program. The school also offers dual-credit college courses and boasts a fully operational College Board Advanced Placement (AP) Program.

== Athletics and clubs ==
John Marshall High School's mascot is the Monarch. It has athletic programs in archery, football, basketball, bowling, baseball, soccer, swimming, volleyball, tennis, cross country, track and field, golf, wrestling, cheerleading, and lacrosse. John Marshall competes in the Ohio Valley Athletic Conference.

== Notable alumni ==
- Lionel Cartwright, country music singer, class of 1978
- Amy Gamble, 1988 Olympian, class of 1983
- Cynthia Germanotta, philanthropist, president of Born This Way Foundation, mother of Lady Gaga and Natali Germanotta
- Brad Paisley, country music star, class of 1991
- Ted Valentine, college basketball referee
- Charlie Reynolds, politician
