= O'Bannon (surname) =

O’Bannon is an Irish surname. Notable people with the name include:

- Charles O’Bannon (born 1975), American basketball player
- Chuck O'Bannon Jr. (born 1999), American basketball player
- Dan O’Bannon (1946-2009), American screenwriter and film director
- Ed O’Bannon (born 1972), American basketball player and 1995 NCAA Tournament MOP
- Frank O’Bannon (1930–2003), American politician from Indiana
- Helen O’Bannon (1939–1988), American academic and economist
- Presley O’Bannon (1776–1850), U.S. Marine Corps officer, famous for his exploits in the First Barbary War
- Robert Presley O'Bannon (1898–1987), American politician from Indiana
- Rockne S. O’Bannon (born 1955), American television writer and producer

== See also ==
- Bannon, surname
