= Woodruff, West Virginia =

Woodruff
- Unincorporated community
- Location within the state of West Virginia Woodruff (the United States)
- Coordinates: 39°46′18″N 80°32′16″W
- Country: United States
- State: West Virginia
- County: Marshall
- Elevation: 958 ft (292 m)
- Time zone: UTC-5 (Eastern (EST))
  - Summer (DST): UTC-4 (EDT)
- GNIS ID: 1549381

Woodruff is an unincorporated community in Marshall County, West Virginia, United States.
