= O'Bannon =

O'Bannon may refer to:

== Ships ==
- USS O'Bannon (DD-177), U.S. Navy Wickes-class destroyer (1919–1922)
- USS O'Bannon (DD-450), U.S. Navy Fletcher-class destroyer (1942–1970)
- USS O'Bannon (DD-987), U.S. Navy Spruance-class destroyer (1979–2005)

== Others ==
- O'Bannon (surname), includes a list of people with the name
- O'Bannon, Louisville, neighborhood in Kentucky, U.S.

== See also ==
- Bannon (disambiguation)
