= 1894 Maryland Aggies football team =

American college football season

1894 Maryland Aggies football
- Conference: Maryland Intercollegiate Football Association
- Record: 4–3 (2–2 MIFA)
- Head coach: J. G. Bannon (1st season)
- Captain: Barnes Compton

1894 Maryland Intercollegiate Football Association standings
	Conf.					Overall
Team	W		L		T	W		L		T
Maryland	2	–	2	–	0	4	–	3	–	0
$ – Conference champion

The 1894 Maryland Aggies football team represented the Maryland Agricultural College (now the University of Maryland) in the 1894 college football season. Maryland participated as a member of the Maryland Intercollegiate Football Association, which was formed as a result of a disagreement the previous season over whether Maryland or St. John's College deserved the state championship. The Aggies finished the season with a 4–3 record.

The following year, the football program was temporarily disbanded until the 1896 season.

== Schedule ==
Date	Opponent	Site	Result
October 10	Orient Athletic Club*	College Park, MD	W 30–0
October 12	Western Maryland	College Park, MD	W 52–0
October 20	at Washington College	Chestertown, MD	W 12–0
October 27	at St. John's (MD)	Annapolis, MD	L 6–22
November 7	Georgetown*	College Park, MD	W 6–4
November 21	at Columbia Athletic Club*	Washington, DC	L 0–26
November 29	Mount St. Mary's	Emmitsburg, MD	L 0–24
*Non-conference game

== Players ==
The letterwinners on the 1894 team were:

- J. G. Bannon, end and player-coach: (May 1, 1874 – January 19, 1937) graduated with a B.S. through the Scientific Course in 1895. He was the son of Maryland State Senator Michael Bannon.
- Wade Blackistone, end
- Clifton E. Fuller, halfback/quarterback: (May 1, 1873 – September 3, 1958) a native of Cumberland, Maryland, he graduated in 1896. Fuller worked for many years as a freight agent for the Railway Express Agency in Cumberland and served one term as a city councilman. He attended every Maryland homecoming game in College Park between 1932 and 1957. He was a member of the Knights of the Golden Eagle.
- Samuel "Pop" Harding, tackle/guard: (January 19, 1873 – May 19, 1919) born in Highland, Maryland, he graduated with a B.S. through the Scientific Course in 1895. Harding worked for the Water Department in Washington, D.C., first as a skilled laborer and eventually working his way to the position of foreman.
- George Harris, quarterback
- Roland L. Harrison, halfback: born May 4, 1875, in Charlotte Hall, Maryland, he graduated with a B.S. through the Scientific Course in 1895. Harrison worked as a topographer for the U.S. Geological Survey.
- Harry H. Heward, tackle: born in Crisfield, Maryland, he attended Snow Hill High School and earned a B.S. through the Scientific Course in 1897. In September 1899, he began work as a wholesale oyster dealer in Philadelphia. He married Mary C. née Weamer on January 18, 1905.
- Grenville Lewis, fullback: (November 12, 1875 – September 1964) born in Washington, D.C., he graduated with a B.S. through the Scientific Course in 1897. He attended Columbian University Law School, where he also coached and played on the football team. He worked in Honduras as a cattle rancher until 1900, and then as an engineer for several mining companies.
- Clarence S. Mullikin, end: born on January 7, 1875, in Prince George's County, Maryland, he graduated with a B.S. through the Scientific Course in 1895. He worked as a teacher in Prince George's County public schools until 1898, when he became a farmer and entered politics. He was appointed to a post in the Census Bureau responsible for the Fifth Congressional District of Maryland. He resigned in 1900 to enter a seminary in Virginia. In 1903, he traveled to Alaska as a missionary, and in 1907, moved to Brookfield, Connecticut. He married Annah H. née Davenport on September 30, 1903, and the couple had three children.
- Clarence N. Walker, center: born on May 2, 1876, in Branchville, Maryland, he graduated with a B.S. through the Scientific Course in 1896. He earned an A.B. from the National Law University in 1900, and an LL.M. in 1901. Walker worked as a patent solicitor in Washington, D.C., and in 1902, he married Rose née Evans with whom he had two children.
- Thomas R. Wharton, guard: born on June 10, 1876, in Stockton, Maryland, he attended Stockton High School. Wharton left Maryland Agricultural College before graduation to enter business as a merchant. He married Mary H. née Purnell on November 12, 1903, and the couple had one child.
- Arthur Wooters, guard

Non-letterwinners:

- William T. L. "Sherman" Rollins, halfback: he graduated with a B.S. through the Scientific Course in 1896 and worked as a supervisor of the census and inspector for the Post Office in Seat Pleasant, Maryland.
- R. B. "Bob" Beale, tackle: born on February 12, 1878, in Washington, D.C., he graduated with a B.S. through the Scientific Course in 1896. Beale attended Johns Hopkins University, where he earned a certificate of proficiency in electricity in 1899. He worked for the General Electric Company in Schenectady, New York. He married Katharine née Summerhages in February 1905.
- John J. Timanus, tackle: he graduated with a B.S. through the Scientific Course in 1895 and worked as an attorney-at-law in Towson, Maryland.
- Barnes Compton, end and captain: son of a wealthy Maryland plantation owner, he graduated in 1895 with a B.S. in the Scientific Course and became a clerk of the B&O Railroad. Compton died sometime before 1914.
- Pete Duffy, halfback
- Ernest Millison, halfback

Manager:

- George Harris
