= Rosbys Rock, West Virginia =

Rosbys Rock
- Unincorporated community
- Location within the state of West Virginia Rosbys Rock (the United States)
- Coordinates: 39°50′29″N 80°42′43″W
- Country: United States
- State: West Virginia
- County: Marshall
- Elevation: 778 ft (237 m)
- Time zone: UTC-5 (Eastern (EST))
  - Summer (DST): UTC-4 (EDT)
- GNIS ID: 1546066

Rosbys Rock is an unincorporated community in Marshall County, West Virginia, United States.

The community was named after Roseby Carr, who with his son led two railroad construction crews that met on December 24, 1852 and thereby connected the Baltimore and Ohio Railroad to the Ohio River near a huge (900 cubic yard) sandstone boulder near the original town site.

At the height of train service, eight passenger trains and eight to twelve freight trains passed through the town daily, and B&O crews kept painting a memorial sign (originally carved with typographical error) on the rock. The last passenger train ran through the village in 1957 and the last freight train in 1972 or 1973. The tracks were removed in 1974 and replaced by an unpaved road (Boulder Road)(on the opposite side of Grave Creek from the paved Grave Creek road).

The historical marker about the event is about 5 miles west of the actual rock, at the intersection of Lafayette and 12th Streets near the Ohio River bridge, with additional signage on 12th street pointing the route to Grave Creek Road.
