= Ted Valentine =

American college basketball referee

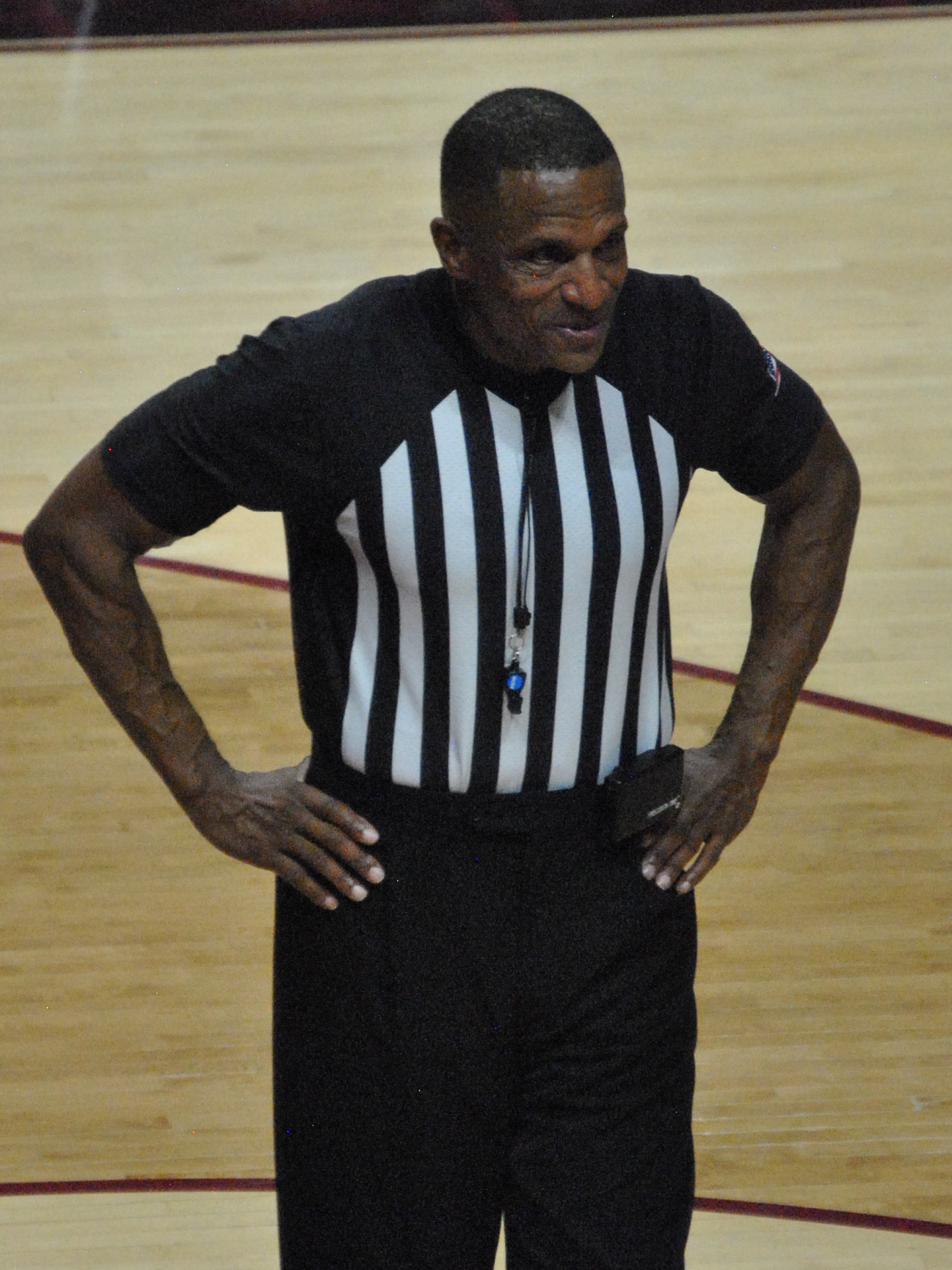
- Born: Theodore Valentine; 1958 or 1959 (age 67–68)
- Education: Glenville State College
- Occupation: Basketball referee
- Years active: 1981–present
- Children: 1 daughter
- Awards: Naismith College Official of the Year

Theodore Valentine (born circa 1959) is an American college basketball referee. Over a career spanning four decades he has refereed four NCAA championships, 10 Final Fours, and 28 NCAA tournaments. In 2005, he won the Naismith College Official of the Year.

== Early life and career ==
Valentine grew up in a high-income, gated community, just outside of Moundsville, West Virginia. He was raised by his mother, who was a worker at a Louis Marx and Company factory, making big wheel tricycles. His mother would put cardboard into her shoes over worn soles to save money. He did not know his father until junior high. In the same year he met his father, he witnessed a friend die from an accidental gunshot wound to the head. Following this, he developed a stutter, for which he saw two speech therapists. He attended John Marshall High School, where he played baseball for three years.

He attended Glenville State College, where he majored in physical education. He played first base for his college baseball team. He graduated in 1980. Though he did not play basketball, he was a manager on his college's basketball team. He was inducted into his college's sports hall of fame in 2006, after lettering in baseball. Following college, he returned to John Marshall High School, becoming a physical education and driver's education teacher, as well as a coach. In 1985, he was an assistant coach for the John Marshall High School baseball team that won the West Virginia Class AAA State Championship.

While Valentine has never played organized basketball, he has coached, if briefly. While in college, he was a student teacher at Weston Junior High in Weston, West Virginia. He was an assistant coach for the school's junior high girls team. The head coach had taken maternity leave, leading to Valentine being the substitute head coach for a game. He received three technicals before half time, and was ejected. On his way off the court, he passed the principal of the school who said "You just coached your last game."

Following knee surgery, Valentine moved to Charleston, South Carolina, in 2003. In addition to refereeing, Valentine also works part-time for the North Charleston Recreation Department.

== Basketball referee career ==
While doing janitorial work in a gym on work-study program in college, Valentine had observed basketball referees and decided he wanted to be a college basketball referee. He talked with some referees about how to get started in the profession, and took a class. He began refereeing at kids games, later moving up to junior high and high school games. In 1981, he attended a refereeing camp in Bristol, Connecticut, run by NBA Hall of Fame member Dallas Shirley. While there, he poured out a cooler of ice water from a window onto sunbathers below the window. Shirley threw Valentine out of the camp for the stunt. A few months later, Shirley offered him a job as a referee.

Valentine worked his first NCAA Division I men's basketball game in 1981 at the former Baptist College, now Charleston Southern University. He was paid $150 for the game, and received speeding tickets both on the way and returning from the game. In 1986, he was hired by Bob Wortman, who was then the Big Ten Conference's director of officials. Wortman was looking to diversify his staff, and after an interview offered Valentine a job refereeing 30 games. Wortman personally trained Valentine. He quit teaching and became a full-time college referee in 1988. Before his first NCAA Championship game, Valentine lost his official pass and nearly did not get into the game.

Valentine refereed his first NCAA Final Four in 1991. He worked 26 consecutive NCAA tournaments until 2015, when he stepped aside from his work to spend time with his brother, who was dying from cancer.

Valentine was to work the 2021 NCAA tournament in Indianapolis but was sent home because of COVID-19 protocols as he either tested positive or was in close contact with a fellow referee who tested positive after arriving in Indianapolis.

Valentine has been referred by the nickname of "TV Teddy" for his officiating style, described by some as theatrical.

=== Controversies ===
On February 24, 1998, Valentine officiated a game between Indiana and Illinois. Valentine called three technical fouls during the game on Bob Knight; one in the first half, and two in the second half. Ed Hightower, also an official for the game, attempted to get Valentine to rescind the second technical, which Valentine had issued against Knight for Knight walking onto the floor to attend to an injured player, which is allowable under NCAA rules. Valentine refused to rescind the call. Knight vociferously protested, resulting in the third technical. Knight later referred to Valentine's officiating as "the greatest travesty" he had witnessed over his career. Knight was fined $10,000 by the Big Ten Conference. Valentine was censured for making the "clearly erroneous" second technical, and was placed under restrictions for non-conference Big Ten Conference basketball games for the following season.

On March 1, 2014, during a game involving the Cincinnati Bearcats, the team's coach Mick Cronin contested an out of bounds call. Valentine got into Cronin's face and the two men needed to be separated. Valentine later apologized.

On January 3, 2018, Valentine was involved in an incident during an Atlantic Coast Conference (ACC) game where Joel Berry II was coming to talk to him about a call. Valentine turned his back on Berry rather than discuss the call with him. Following this, he was removed from officiating two Big Ten Conference games. He contemplated retirement for a time following this incident. Valentine apologized to Berry at the next game of Berry's that Valentine was officiating. Berry's head coach Roy Williams was not critical of Valentine's officiating in the game. The ACC indicated they were handling the incident internally, and a week after the game, a spokesman for the ACC said the incident was a non-issue. That March, Valentine was informed he would not be working the 2018 NCAA tournament. Valentine believed the banishment from the tournament stemmed from the January incident.

== Personal life ==
He has one daughter, Joneesha, and a granddaughter.
