= McMechen, West Virginia =

City in West Virginia, US

- City
- Location of McMechen in Marshall County, West Virginia.
- Coordinates: 39°59′14″N 80°43′53″W
- Country: United States
- State: West Virginia
- County: Marshall

Area
  - Total: 0.83 sq mi (2.16 km^{2})
  - Land: 0.57 sq mi (1.48 km^{2})
  - Water: 0.27 sq mi (0.69 km^{2})
- Elevation: 679 ft (207 m)

Population (2020)
  - Total: 1,697
  - Estimate (2021): 1,680
  - Density: 2,973.1/sq mi (1,147.92/km^{2})
- Time zone: UTC-5 (Eastern (EST))
  - Summer (DST): UTC-4 (EDT)
- ZIP code: 26040
- Area code: 304
- FIPS code: 54-50260
- GNIS feature ID: 1543032
- Website: cityofmcmechen.com

McMechen is a city in Marshall County, West Virginia, United States, situated along the Ohio River. It is part of the Wheeling metropolitan area. The population was 1,714 at the 2020 census.

== History ==
McMechen is named after William McMechen and his family, pioneer settlers.

The McMechen Lockmaster Houses on the Ohio River were listed on the National Register of Historic Places in 1992.

McMechen was incorporated in 1895.

== Geography ==
According to the United States Census Bureau, the city has a total area of 0.84 square miles (2.18 km^{2}), of which 0.57 square miles (1.48 km^{2}) is land and 0.27 square miles (0.70 km^{2}) is water.

=== Climate ===
The climate in this area is characterized by relatively high temperatures and evenly distributed precipitation throughout the year. According to the Köppen Climate Classification system, McMechen has a Humid subtropical climate, abbreviated "Cfa" on climate maps.

== Demographics ==
Historical population
Census	Pop.	Note	%±
1890	427		—
1900	1,465		243.1%
1910	2,921		99.4%
1920	3,356		14.9%
1930	3,710		10.5%
1940	3,726		0.4%
1950	3,518		−5.6%
1960	2,999		−14.8%
1970	2,808		−6.4%
1980	2,402		−14.5%
1990	2,130		−11.3%
2000	1,937		−9.1%
2010	1,926		−0.6%
2020	1,697		−11.9%
2021 (est.)	1,680		−1.0%
U.S. Decennial Census

=== 2020 census ===
As of the 2020 census, McMechen had a population of 1,697. The median age was 40.5 years. 21.3% of residents were under the age of 18 and 20.6% of residents were 65 years of age or older. For every 100 females there were 94.2 males, and for every 100 females age 18 and over there were 89.1 males age 18 and over.

100.0% of residents lived in urban areas, while 0.0% lived in rural areas.

There were 750 households in McMechen, of which 28.1% had children under the age of 18 living in them. Of all households, 34.5% were married-couple households, 22.0% were households with a male householder and no spouse or partner present, and 33.3% were households with a female householder and no spouse or partner present. About 36.3% of all households were made up of individuals and 17.0% had someone living alone who was 65 years of age or older.

There were 883 housing units, of which 15.1% were vacant. The homeowner vacancy rate was 3.2% and the rental vacancy rate was 16.8%.

Racial composition as of the 2020 census
Race	Number	Percent
White	1,592	93.8%
Black or African American	13	0.8%
American Indian and Alaska Native	2	0.1%
Asian	9	0.5%
Native Hawaiian and Other Pacific Islander	0	0.0%
Some other race	9	0.5%
Two or more races	72	4.2%
Hispanic or Latino (of any race)	20	1.2%

=== 2010 census ===
As of the census of 2010, there were 1,926 people, 856 households, and 516 families living in the city. The population density was 3,378.9 inhabitants per square mile (1,304.6/km^{2}). There were 971 housing units at an average density of 1,703.5 per square mile (657.7/km^{2}). The racial makeup of the city was 97.7% White, 1.0% African American, 0.2% Native American, 0.2% Asian, 0.1% from other races, and 0.8% from two or more races. Hispanic or Latino of any race were 1.0% of the population.

There were 856 households, of which 26.4% had children under the age of 18 living with them, 40.4% were married couples living together, 14.7% had a female householder with no husband present, 5.1% had a male householder with no wife present, and 39.7% were non-families. 35.0% of all households were made up of individuals, and 16.5% had someone living alone who was 65 years of age or older. The average household size was 2.24 and the average family size was 2.88.

The median age in the city was 41.6 years. 20.9% of residents were under the age of 18; 8.3% were between the ages of 18 and 24; 24.7% were from 25 to 44; 28.4% were from 45 to 64; and 17.7% were 65 years of age or older. The gender makeup of the city was 48.6% male and 51.4% female.

=== 2000 census ===
As of the census of 2000, there were 1,937 people, 865 households, and 559 families living in the city. The population density was 3,352.4 people per square mile (1,289.4/km^{2}). There were 953 housing units at an average density of 1,649.4 per square mile (634.4/km^{2}). The racial makeup of the city was 98.55% White, 0.36% African American, 0.10% Native American, 0.10% Asian, 0.15% from other races, and 0.72% from two or more races. Hispanic or Latino of any race were 0.41% of the population.

There were 865 households, out of which 24.6% had children under the age of 18 living with them, 46.5% were married couples living together, 14.6% had a female householder with no husband present, and 35.3% were non-families. 33.1% of all households were made up of individuals, and 19.0% had someone living alone who was 65 years of age or older. The average household size was 2.23 and the average family size was 2.81.

In the city, the population was spread out, with 20.8% under the age of 18, 7.0% from 18 to 24, 23.5% from 25 to 44, 26.0% from 45 to 64, and 22.8% who were 65 years of age or older. The median age was 44 years. For every 100 females, there were 89.2 males. For every 100 females age 18 and over, there were 81.9 males.

The median income for a household in the city was $27,179, and the median income for a family was $33,080. Males had a median income of $27,357 versus $16,862 for females. The per capita income for the city was $14,935. About 15.6% of families and 20.6% of the population were below the poverty line, including 43.1% of those under age 18 and 9.6% of those age 65 or over.

== Education ==
Marshall County Schools operates public schools.

- Center McMechen Elementary School.

== Notable people ==
- Charles Manson, spent part of his childhood in McMechen.
- George D. Wallace, actor; spent teen years in McMechen.
- Alvena Sečkar, painter and author born in McMechen

== See also ==
- List of cities and towns along the Ohio River
