= Natrium, West Virginia =

Natrium
- Unincorporated community
- Location within the state of West Virginia Natrium (the United States)
- Coordinates: 39°44′53″N 80°51′5″W
- Country: United States
- State: West Virginia
- County: Marshall
- Elevation: 669 ft (204 m)
- Time zone: UTC-5 (Eastern (EST))
  - Summer (DST): UTC-4 (EDT)
- GNIS ID: 1555191

Natrium is an unincorporated community in Marshall County, West Virginia, United States.

Natrium is home to the PPG Natrium Wildlife Management Area, a protected area along the Ohio River maintained by PPG Industries.
