= Mount Olivet, Marshall County, West Virginia =

Mount Olivet, West Virginia
- Unincorporated community
- Location within West Virginia Location within the United States
- Coordinates: 40°01′09″N 80°41′42″W
- Country: United States
- State: West Virginia
- County: Marshall
- Elevation: 1,276 ft (389 m)
- Time zone: UTC-5 (Eastern (EST))
  - Summer (DST): UTC-4 (EDT)
- Area codes: 304 & 681
- GNIS feature ID: 1543726

Mount Olivet is an unincorporated community in Marshall County, West Virginia, United States. Mount Olivet is 2 miles (3.2 km) south of Bethlehem.
