= Fairview, Mingo County, West Virginia =

Unincorporated community in West Virginia, United States

Fairview
- Unincorporated community
- Location within the state of West Virginia Fairview (the United States)
- Coordinates: 37°40′40″N 82°18′10″W
- Country: United States
- State: West Virginia
- County: Mingo
- Elevation: 659 ft (201 m)
- Time zone: UTC-5 (Eastern (EST))
  - Summer (DST): UTC-4 (EDT)
- GNIS ID: 1554433

Fairview is an unincorporated community in Mingo County, West Virginia, United States.
