= Fairview (near Elkins), Randolph County, West Virginia =

Unincorporated community in West Virginia, United States

Fairview, West Virginia
- Unincorporated community
- Location within West Virginia Location within the United States
- Coordinates: 38°56′56″N 79°47′02″W
- Country: United States
- State: West Virginia
- County: Randolph
- Elevation: 2,382 ft (726 m)
- Time zone: UTC-5 (Eastern (EST))
  - Summer (DST): UTC-4 (EDT)
- Area codes: 304 & 681
- GNIS feature ID: 1551077

Fairview is an unincorporated community in Randolph County, West Virginia, United States. Fairview is 4 miles (6.4 km) northeast of Elkins.
