= Boggs Run (Ohio River tributary) =

Tributary of the Ohio River

Boggs Run Tributary to Ohio River
- Location of Boggs Run mouth Boggs Run (Ohio River tributary) (the United States)

Location
- Country: United States
- States: West Virginia
- County: Marshall
- City: Wheeling

Physical characteristics
- Source: Brandau Hollow divide
  - location: about 0.25 miles northwest of Sherrard, West Virginia
  - coordinates: 39°59′46″N 080°41′02″W
  - elevation: 1,120 ft (340 m)
- Mouth: Ohio River
  - location: Wheeling, West Virginia
  - coordinates: 40°01′36″N 080°48′38″W
  - elevation: 623 ft (190 m)
- Length: 2.67 mi (4.30 km)
- Basin size: 4.94 square miles (12.8 km^{2})
- Discharge
  - location: Ohio River
  - average: 6.31 cu ft/s (0.179 m^{3}/s) at mouth with Ohio River

Basin features
- Progression: Ohio River → Mississippi River → Gulf of Mexico
- River system: Ohio River
- Tributaries
  - left: unnamed tributaries
  - right: Browns Run
- Bridges: Boggs Run Road (x5), Marshall County Road, Boggs Run Road (x3), Dreamers Run Lane, Boggs Run Road (x5), Alley D, Alley C, US 250/WV 2, Marshall Street

Boggs Run is a 2.67 mi (4.30 km) long 3rd order tributary to the Ohio River in Marshall County, West Virginia.

== Course ==
Boggs Run rises about 0.25 miles northwest of Sherrard, West Virginia, and then flows northwesterly to join the Ohio River at the south end of Wheeling, West Virginia.

== Watershed ==
Boggs Run drains 4.94 square miles (12.8 km^{2}) of area, receives about 41.4 in/year of precipitation, has a wetness index of 269.18, and is about 67% forested.

== See also ==
- List of rivers of West Virginia
