= Fairview, Marshall County, West Virginia =

Unincorporated community in West Virginia, United States

Fairview
- Unincorporated community
- Location within the state of West Virginia Fairview (the United States)
- Coordinates: 39°44′23″N 80°47′26″W
- Country: United States
- State: West Virginia
- County: Marshall
- Elevation: 1,371 ft (418 m)
- Time zone: UTC-5 (Eastern (EST))
  - Summer (DST): UTC-4 (EDT)
- GNIS ID: 1538796

Fairview is an unincorporated community in Marshall County, West Virginia, United States. It was also known as Ella and Nauvoo.

A colony of early Mormons settled here.
