= Des Bannon =

Australian rugby player

- Born: Desmond Patrick Bannon; 19 April 1923 Haberfield, New South Wales
- Died: 24 July 2000 (aged 77) Wamberal, New South Wales
- School: St Joseph's College

Rugby union career
- Position: fly-half
International career
Years	Team	Apps	(Points)
1946	Wallabies	1	(0)

Desmond Patrick Bannon (19 April 1923 – 24 July 2000) was a rugby union player who represented Australia.

Bannon, a fly-half, was born in Haberfield, New South Wales and claimed 1 international rugby cap for Australia.

== Published sources ==
- Howell, Max (2006) Born to Lead - Wallaby Test Captains (2005) Celebrity Books, New Zealand
