= Fairview, Greenbrier County, West Virginia =

- Ghost town
- Location within West Virginia
- Coordinates: 37°59′52″N 80°44′56″W
- Country: United States
- State: West Virginia
- County: Greenbrier
- Elevation: 2,421 ft (738 m)
- GNIS feature ID

Fairview is a ghost town in Greenbrier County, West Virginia, United States. Fairview was 1 mile (1.6 km) southwest of the unincorporated community of Charmco. Fairview appeared on Soil Conservation Service maps as late as 1937.
