= James Bannon =

James Bannon may refer to:

- James Bannon (Irish politician) (born 1958), Irish Fine Gael politician
- James Bannon (Wisconsin politician) (1852–1938), American farmer and politician
- Jim Bannon (1911–1984), American actor and radio announcer
- Jimmy Bannon (1871–1948), American baseball player
