= Cresap, West Virginia =

Unincorporated community in West Virginia, United States

Cresap
- Unincorporated community
- Location within the state of West Virginia Cresap (the United States)
- Coordinates: 39°50′36″N 80°49′0″W
- Country: United States
- State: West Virginia
- County: Marshall
- Elevation: 692 ft (211 m)
- Time zone: UTC-5 (Eastern (EST))
  - Summer (DST): UTC-4 (EDT)
- GNIS ID: 1549647

Cresap is an unincorporated community in Marshall County, West Virginia, United States.
