= Weightless (novel) =

2015 young adult novel by Sarah Bannan

- First edition UK hardback cover
- Author: Sarah Bannan
- Audio read by: Andi Arndt
- Language: English
- Genre: Young adult fiction
- Published: 2015
- Publisher: Bloomsbury Circus, St. Martin's Griffin
- Publication place: United Kingdom
- Media type: Print, e-book, audiobook
- Pages: 336 pages
- ISBN: 9781408856420

Weightless, released in Germany as Die Neue (The New), is a 2015 young adult novel and the debut work of the American author Sarah Bannan. It was first published in the United Kingdom through Bloomsbury Circus on 12 March 2015, followed by a United States release on 30 June through St. Martin's Griffin. The work deals with the themes of cyberbullying and peer pressure and is told from the viewpoint of several anonymous narrators as they reflect upon the appearance of a new student that stirs up differing emotions from various people.

== Synopsis ==
The book's plot predominantly centers upon Carolyn Lessing, a beautiful young teenager that has moved to Adamsville, Alabama and has recently begun attending the local high school. She's initially met with a largely positive reception from the student body, as they're both awed and envious of her, and she soon begins dating Shane, one of the most popular guys at school. However even as they praise her, Carolyn is still an outsider and is more treasured for what she represents (wealth, glamour, talent, fame) than for herself as a person - something that becomes more readily apparent when her relationship with Shane brings about the wrath of one of the school's mean girls. As time progresses her peers begin to bully Carolyn, first slowly and then with more emphasis. Despite these actions taking a very negative toll on Carolyn's physical and mental well-being, the bullying is largely met with apathy because it was so slow to develop and most of the onlookers are inured to what they're seeing and many even believe that she brought this about on herself.

== Development ==
Bannan drew upon her own childhood experiences for Weightless and was also inspired by a news story about an American teenager that committed suicide as a result of cyberbullying. Bannan chose to set the work in a small town as she felt that they tend to give more weight and consideration to rumors and gossip, and because she felt that this was hypocritical to how small towns are typically portrayed. She also decided that rather than narrate the book from the perspective of one person that it would be better to use the first person plural narrative, as this made the work feel more "real, authentic and natural".

== Reception ==
Critical reception has been positive. The Irish Times and the Irish Independent both gave favorable reviews for Weightless, with both outlets citing the book's themes of cyberbullying and peer pressure as highlights. The Argus also enjoyed this aspect, which they felt was "immensely effective, providing a bird’s-eye view that forces you to realise that bullying and its consequences are far more complex (and at the same time, so brutally simple) than we might sometimes think, and to see how everybody, somehow, is involved or has their own perception of things."
