= John Bannon (disambiguation) =

John Bannon (1943–2015) was an Australian politician, academic, and premier of South Australia.

John Bannon or Jack Bannon may also refer to:

- John B. Bannon (1829–1913), Irish Catholic chaplain and Confederate agent to Europe during the American Civil War
- John Francis Bannon (1905–1986), Jesuit and American West historian
- John Bannon (referee), Gaelic football referee
- Jack Bannon (American actor) (John James Bannon, 1940–2017)
- Jack Bannon (English actor) (born 1991)
