= Fairview (near Helvetia), Randolph County, West Virginia =

Unincorporated community in West Virginia, United States

Fairview, West Virginia
- Unincorporated community
- Location within West Virginia Location within the United States
- Coordinates: 38°41′43″N 80°13′55″W
- Country: United States
- State: West Virginia
- County: Randolph
- Elevation: 2,910 ft (890 m)
- Time zone: UTC-5 (Eastern (EST))
  - Summer (DST): UTC-4 (EDT)
- Area codes: 304 & 681
- GNIS feature ID: 1549677

Fairview is an unincorporated community in Randolph County, West Virginia, United States. Fairview is 2 miles (3.2 km) west-southwest of Helvetia and 14 miles (23 km) west of Huttonsville.
