= Wolf Run (Tygart Valley River tributary) =

Stream in West Virginia, U.S.

Coordinates: 39°12′49″N 79°59′25″W

Wolf Run is a stream in the U.S. state of West Virginia. It is a tributary to the Tygart Valley River.

Wolf Run was named from an incident when a hunter shot a wolf near its course.
