= Sand Hill, Marshall County, West Virginia =

Sand Hill
- Unincorporated community
- Location within the state of West Virginia Sand Hill (the United States)
- Coordinates: 39°59′15″N 80°35′6″W
- Country: United States
- State: West Virginia
- County: Marshall
- Elevation: 1,312 ft (400 m)
- Time zone: UTC-5 (Eastern (EST))
  - Summer (DST): UTC-4 (EDT)
- GNIS ID: 1555561

Sand Hill is an unincorporated community in Marshall County, West Virginia, United States.
