= Bernard Bannon =

English solicitor and sportsman

Personal information
- Full name: Bernard Douglas Bannon
- Born: 7 December 1874; Goudhurst, Kent
- Died: 18 December 1938 (aged 64); Virginia Water, Surrey
- Batting: Right-handed

Domestic team information
- Years: Team
- 1895–1900: Kent
- 1897–1898: Oxford University

Career statistics
Competition	First-class
Matches	36
Runs scored	1,078
Batting average	19.25
100s/50s	0/6
Top score	78
Catches/stumpings	10/–
- Source: ESPNcricinfo, 18 March 2017

Bernard Douglas Bannon (7 December 1874 – 18 December 1938) was an English solicitor and sportsman who played first-class cricket as an amateur for Kent County Cricket Club and Oxford University between 1895 and 1900.

== Early life ==
Bannon was born at Goudhurst in Kent, the eldest son of James Bannon, a solicitor, and his wife Kate (née Mann). He was educated at Tonbridge School between 1890 and 1894. He was Head Boy at Tonbridge in his final year and was an all-round sportsman, captaining the Cricket XI 1893–94 and the Rugby XV 1893 and was joint winner of the Athletic Points' Cup in 1894. He scored an unbeaten 153 for the Cricket XI against Marylebone Cricket Club (MCC) in 1893.

== Sporting career ==
Bannon made his debut for the Kent Second XI in 1893 whilst still at school before going up to Oriel College, Oxford, to study law in September 1894. He made his first-class cricket debut for Kent in July 1895 against Sussex at Catford and played for Oxford University in 1897 and 1898. He won a hockey Blue in 1897 and a cricket Blue in 1898 and represented Oxford in the University Athletic Meeting in 1898, throwing the hammer.

Bannon graduated from Oxford in 1898. He played 12 matches for Kent and eight for the university during the 1898 season before becoming a solicitor, passing his Law exams in 1901. His profession limited his opportunities to play cricket and he made only 11 more appearances for the county, two in 1899 and nine in 1900, scoring a total of 755 runs for Kent. He was awarded his Kent cap in 1898 and made his highest score of 78 runs against Lancashire at Canterbury in the same season.

== War service ==
At the start of World War I Bannon was too old to volunteer. He joined the British Red Cross and, in August 1915, began to work for the French Military Health Service as an ambulance driver in the Vosges. During 1916 he served in the Reillon Salient in Lorraine and around Verdun. There is no record of his service beyond the end of 1916.

== Family and later life ==
Bannon's brother, Raymond, also attended Tonbridge and played for Kent's Second XI between 1902 and 1904. He also became a solicitor and lived and worked in the Malay States. Bannon never married and he died at Holloway Sanatorium near Virginia Water in Surrey in December 1938 aged 64, leaving his estate to his brother.

== Bibliography ==
- Carlaw, Derek (2020). Kent County Cricketers, A to Z: Part One (1806–1914) (PDF). Cardiff: ACS.
