= J. G. Bannon =

American football player and coach (1874–1937)

J.G. Bannon
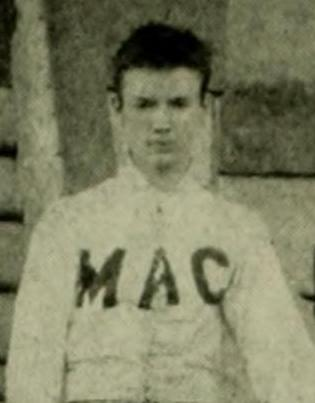
- Bannon at Maryland in 1892

Biographical details
- Born: May 1, 1874; Maryland, U.S.
- Died: January 19, 1937 (aged 62); Jessup, Maryland, U.S.

Playing career
- 1892–1894: Maryland
- Position(s): End

Coaching career (HC unless noted)
- 1894: Maryland

Head coaching record
- Overall: 4–3

Joseph George Bannon (May 1, 1874 – January 19, 1937) was an American college football coach. He served as the head football coach at Maryland Agricultural College—now known as the University of Maryland, College Park—in 1894, compiling a record of 4–3.

== Biography ==
Bannon was born in Maryland on May 1, 1874. His great-grandfather was an officer in the rebellious Irish army during the Rebellion of 1798. His father, Michael Bannon, was born in County Tyrone, Ireland in 1827 and emigrated to the United States, where he arrived in Baltimore in 1847 with only ten cents. He worked as a teacher and eventually received an education in law and established a real estate business. Michael Bannon entered politics in Anne Arundel County and served as a Maryland State Senator. His brother, James P. Bannon, was a prominent Anne Arundel County politician and lawyer.

Bannon attended the Maryland Agricultural College (now the University of Maryland), where he played on the football team as an end from 1892 to 1894. Bannon served as the head coach during the 1894 season and amassed a 4–3 record. He graduated from Maryland with a Bachelor of Science degree in 1895. Bannon died in Jessup, Maryland on January 19, 1937.

== Head coaching record ==
Year	Team	Overall	Conference	Standing	Bowl/playoffs
Maryland Aggies (Maryland Intercollegiate Football Association) (1894)
1894	Maryland	4–3	2–2		
Maryland:		4–3	2–2		
Total:		4–3			
