= Fairview, Wetzel County, West Virginia =

Unincorporated community in West Virginia, United States

Fairview
- Unincorporated community
- Location within the state of West Virginia Fairview (the United States)
- Coordinates: 39°32′23″N 80°32′59″W
- Country: United States
- State: West Virginia
- County: Wetzel
- Elevation: 1,519 ft (463 m)
- Time zone: UTC-5 (Eastern (EST))
  - Summer (DST): UTC-4 (EDT)
- GNIS ID: 1554432

Fairview is an unincorporated community in Wetzel County, West Virginia, United States.
