= Wolf Run, West Virginia =

Wolf Run
- Unincorporated community
- Location within the state of West Virginia Wolf Run (the United States)
- Coordinates: 39°57′20″N 80°34′37″W
- Country: United States
- State: West Virginia
- County: Marshall
- Elevation: 797 ft (243 m)
- Time zone: UTC-5 (Eastern (EST))
  - Summer (DST): UTC-4 (EDT)
- GNIS ID: 1549997

Wolf Run is an unincorporated community in Marshall County, West Virginia, United States.
