= Ružindol =

- Municipality
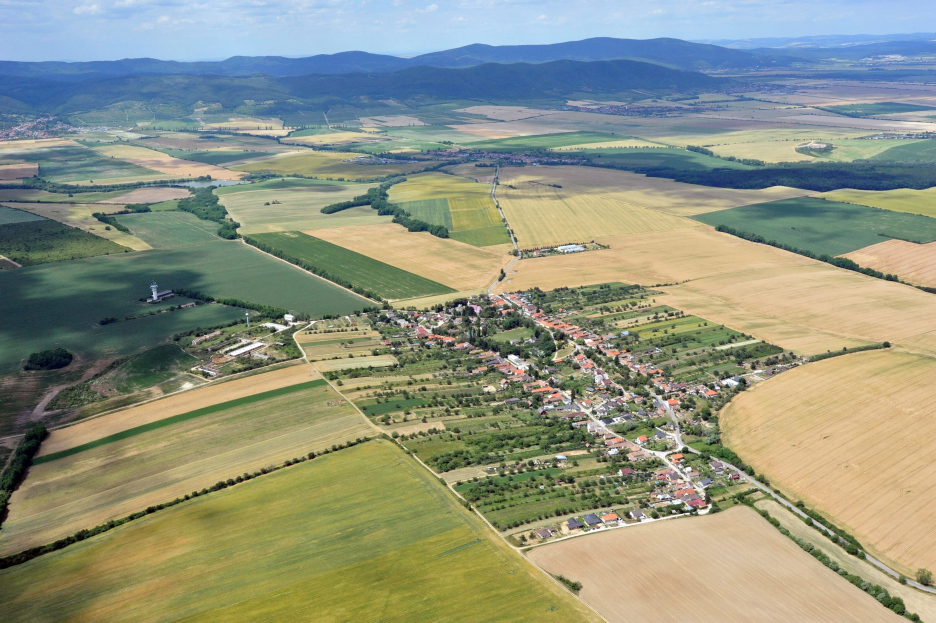

- Flag

- Location of Ružindol in the Trnava Region Location of Ružindol in Slovakia
- Coordinates: 48.37°N 17.50°E
- Country: Slovakia
- Region: Trnava Region
- District: Trnava District
- First mentioned: 1352

Area
  - Total: 14.70 km^{2} (5.68 sq mi)
- Elevation: 166 m (545 ft)

Population (2025)
  - Total: 1,749
- Time zone: UTC+1 (CET)
  - Summer (DST): UTC+2 (CEST)
- Postal code: 919 61
- Area code: +421 33
- Vehicle registration plate (until 2022): TT
- Website: www.ruzindol.sk

Ružindol (Hungarian: Rózsavölgy) is a village and municipality of Trnava District in the Trnava region of Slovakia.

== Geography ==
The municipality lies at an altitude of 166 metres (545 ft) and covers an area of 14.70 km^{2} (5.68 sq mi) (2025).

== Population ==
Population statistic (10 years)
Year	1995	2005	2015	2025
Count	1200	1337	1622	1749
Difference		+11.41%	+21.31%	+7.82%

Population statistic
Year	2024	2025
Count	1726	1749
Difference		+1.33%

It has a population of 1749 people (31 December 2025).

=== Ethnicity ===
Census 2021 (1+ %)
Ethnicity	Number	Fraction
Slovak	1576	94.99%
Not found out	58	3.49%
Czech	20	1.2%
Total	1659	

In year 2021 was 1659 people by ethnicity 1576 as Slovak, 58 as Not found out, 20 as Czech, 9 as Other, 6 as Vietnamese, 6 as Hungarian, 3 as Romanian, 2 as Italian, 2 as Romani, 2 as Rusyn, 2 as German, 1 as Serbian, 1 as Russian, 1 as French and 1 as Croatian.

Note on population: The difference values of population numbers in the table "Population statistic" and in the sections "Ethnicity" & "Religion" is caused by the use of various statistical methods.

=== Religion ===
Census 2021 (1+ %)
Religion	Number	Fraction
Roman Catholic Church	1102	66.43%
None	449	27.06%
Not found out	60	3.62%
Total	1659	

In year 2021 was 1659 people by religion 1102 from Roman Catholic Church, 449 from None, 60 from Not found out, 16 from Evangelical Church, 14 from Greek Catholic Church, 6 from Other, 3 from Eastern Orthodox Church, 2 from Calvinist Church, 2 from Ad hoc movements, 1 from Old Catholic Church, 1 from Other and not ascertained christian church, 1 from Hinduism, 1 from Church of Jesus Christ of Latter-day Saints and 1 from Apostolic Church.
