= Marshall County Schools (West Virginia) =

School district in West Virginia, USA

Marshall County Schools is a school district headquartered in Moundsville, West Virginia, serving all of Marshall County.

== Schools ==
=== High schools ===
- Cameron High School
- John Marshall High School

=== Middle schools ===
- Moundsville Middle School
- Sherrard Middle School

=== Elementary schools ===
- Cameron Elementary School
- Center McMechen Elementary School
- Central Elementary School
- Glen Dale Elementary School
- Hilltop Elementary School
- McNinch Primary School
- Sand Hill Elementary School
- Washington Lands Elementary

=== Preschool and Kindergarten ===
- Marshall County Pre-K & Kindergarten

=== Other ===
- Gateway Achievement Center
