= Blairs Ridge =

Ridge in West Virginia, USA

Coordinates: 39.9006318°N 80.6528585°W

Blairs Ridge is a ridge in West Virginia, in the United States.

Blairs Ridge has the name of J. M. Blair, a local preacher.
