= Interstate 470 (Ohio–West Virginia) =

Highway in Ohio and West Virginia

Interstate 470
- USS West Virginia Memorial Highway (WV)
- I-470 highlighted in red

Route information
- Auxiliary route of I-70
- Maintained by ODOT and WVDOH
- Length: 10.63 mi (17.11 km) 6.69 mi (10.77 km) in Ohio; 3.94 mi (6.34 km) in West Virginia
- Existed: 1976–present
- NHS: Entire route

Major junctions
- West end: I-70 near Blaine, Ohio
- SR 7 near Riverview, Ohio; US 250 / WV 2 in Wheeling, West Virginia
- East end: I-70 in Wheeling, West Virginia

Location
- Country: United States
- States: Ohio, West Virginia
- Counties: Ohio: Belmont; West Virginia: Ohio

Highway system
- Interstate Highway System; Main; Auxiliary; Suffixed; Business; Future
- Ohio State Highway System; Interstate; US; State; Scenic
- West Virginia State Highway System; Interstate; US; State
← SR 450	Ohio	→ I-471
← US 460	West Virginia	→ WV 480

Interstate 470 (I-470) is a 10.63-mile-long (17.11 km) auxiliary Interstate Highway of I-70 that bypasses the city of Wheeling, West Virginia, United States. I-470 is one of 13 auxiliary Interstate Highways in Ohio and the only auxiliary Interstate Highway in West Virginia. The western terminus of I-470 is an interchange with I-70 in Richland Township, Ohio. Traveling southeast through rural Belmont County, I-470 approaches the Vietnam Veterans Memorial Bridge, which spans the Ohio River. After crossing the river into Ohio County, West Virginia, the highway continues east toward the Wheeling communities of Bethlehem and Elm Grove and its eastern terminus at I-70 near Elm Grove. The portion of the highway in West Virginia is named the USS West Virginia Memorial Highway by proclamation of then-Governor Cecil H. Underwood on the 59th anniversary of the attack on Pearl Harbor.

Construction of the freeway began in 1975 in the two states. Due to a chronic lack of funding, construction in Ohio was stalled between 1976 and 1981. After a $0.033-per-US-gallon ($0.040/imp gal; $0.0087/L) fuel tax increase, Ohio was able to restart construction, and, by 1983, both states had completed construction on the freeway. The three-level diamond interchange with concurrent highways U.S. Route 250 (US 250) and West Virginia Route 2 (WV 2) on the eastern banks of the Ohio River was thought to be the most complex interchange in West Virginia's Interstate Highway System at the time of construction. On average, between 25,500 and 37,840 vehicles use the highway daily.

== Route description ==
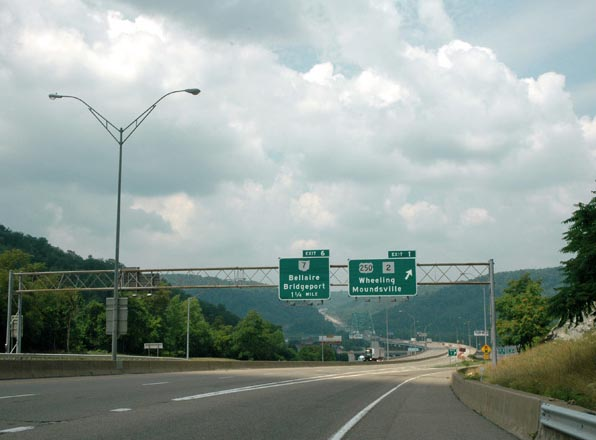
I-470 westbound at the US 250/WV 2 three-level diamond interchange

The freeway begins at a partial interchange with I-70 in Richland Township, Belmont County, Ohio. An exit for County Road 28 (CR 28), the second-last exit for westbound traffic, provides motorists access to US 40. The highway curves to the southeast, passing near the Belmont Memorial Park and through woodlands. I-70 forms part of the northeastern border of Neffs, Pease Township, and briefly parallels High Ridge Road (CR 214) then meets it at a diamond interchange in Pultney Township. High Ridge Road, to the north, connects back to I-70 and, to the south, links Bellaire to the bypass. I-470 continues easterly into a valley before intersecting a trumpet interchange, leading to another interchange with State Route 7 (SR 7) along the western banks of the Ohio River. The Vietnam Veterans Memorial Bridge carries I-470 over three rail lines and the Ohio River (the state line between Ohio and West Virginia). The rail lines on the western banks of the river belong to the Norfolk Southern Railway and the Wheeling and Lake Erie Railway's River Subdivision. The American Automobile Association considers the stretch of I-470 though Ohio to be a scenic highway due to its natural beauty.

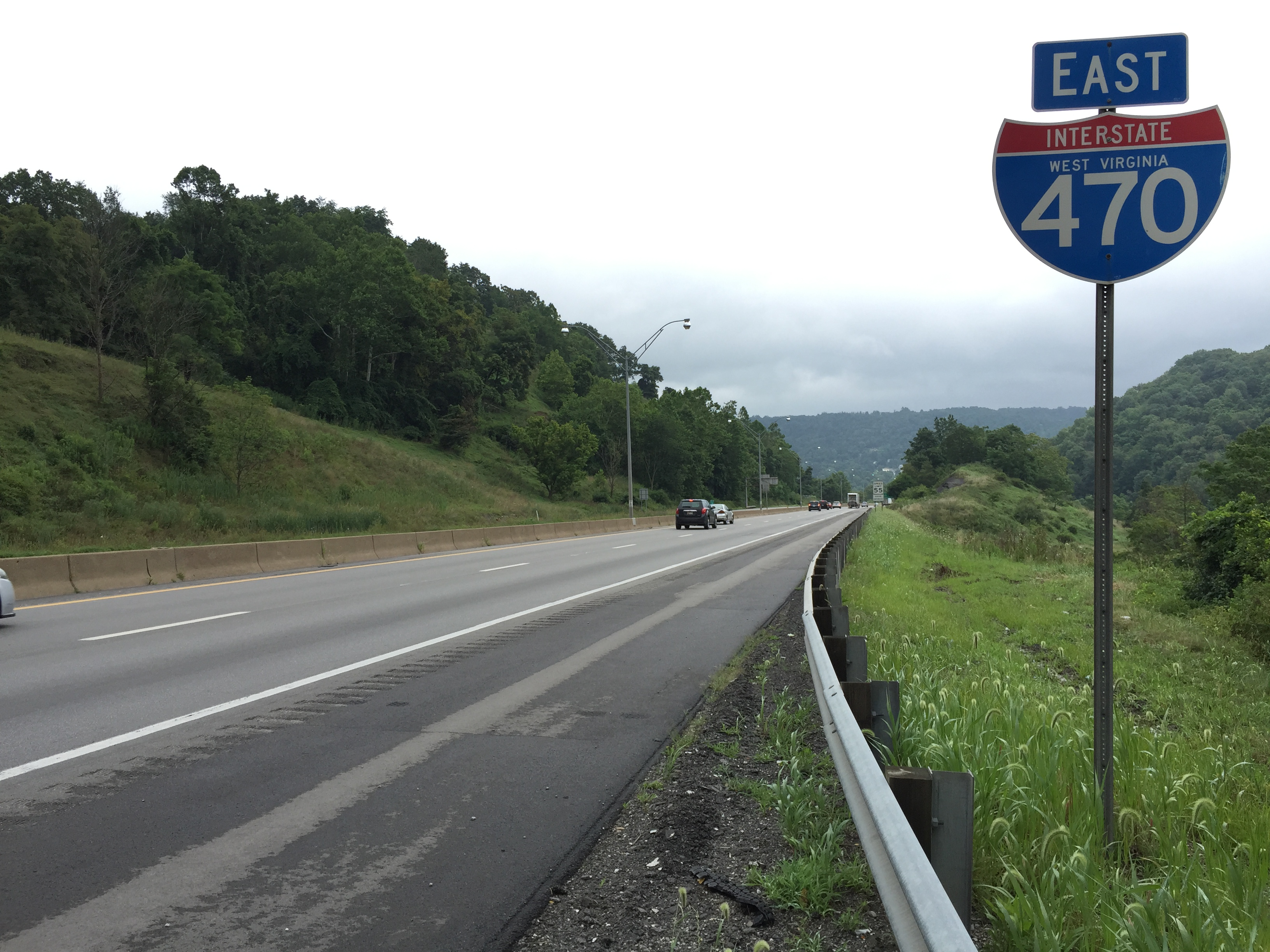
View east along I-470 past the CR 91/CR 1 exit in Bethlehem

I-470 enters the city limits of Wheeling and Ohio County, West Virginia; the Ohio River Trail, a rail trail, passes under the freeway as I-470 approaches a three-level diamond interchange with US 250 and WV 2. The concurrent highways connect to downtown Wheeling in the north and Benwood to the south. I-70 climbs from the banks of the river into more woodlands before an interchange with West Bethlehem Boulevard, which provides access to the village of Bethlehem to the south. Continuing easterly, I-470 comes to its end at an incomplete interchange with its parent, I-70, over Wheeling Creek near Elm Grove and to the north of the J.B. Chambers Youth Sports Complex and Wheeling Skate Park. Traffic from I-470 can only access eastbound I-70, and only traffic traveling westbound on I-70 can access I-470. The Wheeling Creek Trail, which parallels the creek, passes underneath I-470 as it merges into I-70.

I-470 is one of 13 auxiliary Interstate Highways in Ohio and the only auxiliary Interstate Highway in West Virginia. The Ohio Department of Transportation (ODOT) and West Virginia Division of Highways (DOH) conduct surveys on their highways to measure traffic volume. This is expressed in terms of annual average daily traffic (AADT), a measure of average traffic volume for any day of the year. In 2012, they calculated that 26,500 vehicles traveled along the highway at the eastern terminus in West Virginia, and 37,840 vehicles used I-470 across the Vietnam Veterans Memorial Bridge. As part of the Interstate Highway System, the entire route is listed on the National Highway System—a system of roads that are important to the nation's economy, defense, and mobility.

== History ==
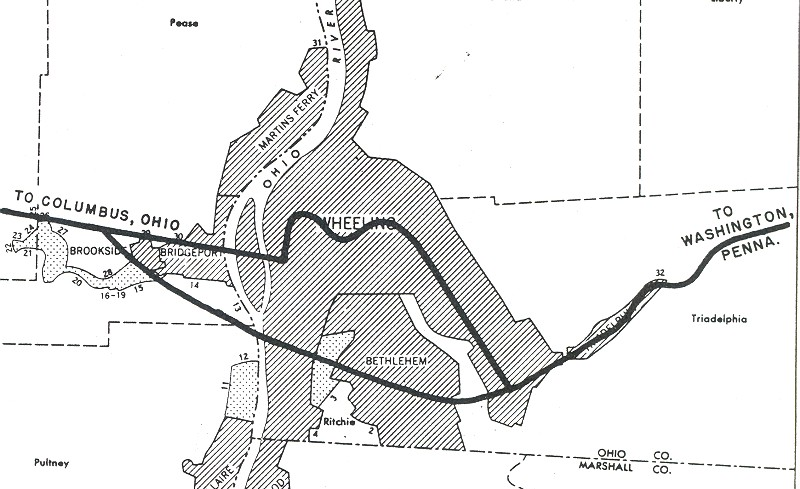
1955 map showing the planned routing of Interstate Highways through Wheeling

Plans for a southern bypass of Wheeling were first published in 1955 in Bureau of Public Roads document titled General Location of National System of Interstate Highways Including All Additional Routes at Urban Areas. An environmental impact statement was filed in 1972 by West Virginia, detailing the I-470 interchange with US 250/WV 2 along the eastern banks of the Ohio River. Tunnels used by the nearby LaBelle Nail Plant, LaBelle being the original French word for the Ohio River, were unearthed during construction of this interchange. A 2.5-mile-long (4.0 km) segment in West Virginia was bid out at just over $16.5 million (equivalent to $70.6 million in 2024) in 1976.

Ohio had completed the stretch of highway from I-70 to just before the SR 7 interchange by 1976, but, due to budget deficiencies, work did not resume in Ohio until 1981. Construction of the bridge linking the two portions of highway was scheduled to be completed by 1981, but construction did not begin until that year. After a $0.033-per-US-gallon ($0.040/imp gal; $0.0087/L) fuel tax increase, Ohio was able to fund the project again. Bids for construction work on the remainder of the Ohio portion of the freeway were solicited in 1981, with an estimated construction time of 37 months for the stretch between I-70 and the bridge.

The West Virginia portion was under construction by 1976, and work in both states was completed by 1983. According to WVDOH spokesperson Gary Chernenko, the three-level diamond interchange on the eastern banks of the Ohio River was the most complex interchange in West Virginia at the time of construction. The opening of the Vietnam Veterans Memorial Bridge, along with another bridge in nearby Moundsville, was thought to have reduced the amount of traffic, and thus tolls collected by the nearby Bellaire Bridge by up to 50 percent in 1987.

Between September 12 and December 22, 1996, about 1,700 feet (518 m) of I-470 in Ohio was closed so ODOT could stabilize and repave the roadway, as the rocks forming the top of an abandoned mine underneath the freeway had become overstressed. The Fort Henry Bridge (which carries I-70), the Vietnam Veterans Memorial Bridge, and the Wheeling Suspension Bridge were all closed in January 2005, stopping any traffic from Ohio or Wheeling Island from entering mainland West Virginia for a few days because barges broke loose during heavy flooding along the Ohio River. The Wheeling Tunnel was closed for reconstruction work in 2007, 2008, and 2010, causing motorists who wished to travel through on I-70 to detour. The two detour routes were city streets in downtown Wheeling and the I-470 loop.

Then-West Virginia governor Cecil H. Underwood issued a proclamation on December 7, 2000, the 59th anniversary of the attack on Pearl Harbor, naming I-470 in West Virginia the USS West Virginia Memorial Highway, in honor of the battleship of that name.

== Exit list ==
State	County	Location	mi	km	Exit	Destinations	Notes
Ohio	Belmont	Richland Township	0.00	0.00	—	I-70 west – Columbus	Western terminus; exit 219 on I-70
Ohio	Belmont	Richland Township			1	Banfield Road / Mall Road	Westbound exit only; access to Ohio Valley Mall
Ohio	Belmont	Pultney Township	3.22	5.18	3	CR 214	
Ohio	Belmont	Pultney Township	6.36	10.24	6	SR 7 – Bellaire, Bridgeport	Trumpet interchange to connector with SR 7
Ohio River			6.69 0.00	10.77 0.00	Vietnam Veterans Memorial Bridge		
West Virginia	Ohio	Wheeling	0.60	0.97	1	US 250 / WV 2 – Wheeling, Moundsville	Three-level diamond interchange
West Virginia	Ohio	Bethlehem	2.20	3.54	2	Bethlehem	Access to WV 88 via CR 911
West Virginia	Ohio	Wheeling	3.94	6.34	—	I-70 east – Washington, PA	Eastern terminus; exit 5A on I-70
1.000 mi = 1.609 km; 1.000 km = 0.621 mi: Incomplete access
