= List of nature centers in Maryland =

This is a list of nature centers and environmental education centers in the state of Maryland.

To use the sortable tables: click on the icons at the top of each column to sort that column in alphabetical order; click again for reverse alphabetical order.

Name	Location	County	Region	Summary
Agricultural History Farm Park	Derwood	Montgomery	Capital	website, operated by Montgomery Parks the 455-acre complex with a historic farm site and a modern farming activity center
Battle Creek Cypress Swamp	Prince Frederick	Calvert	Southern	Nature Conservancy preserve and county park
Bear Branch Nature Center	Westminster	Carroll	Central	Operated by the County. Center located on 320 acres; features live animals, interpretive exhibits, more than five miles of multi-use trails, a planetarium and observatory.
Black Hill Visitors Center	Boyds	Montgomery	Capital	website, operated by Montgomery Parks in Black Hill Regional Park with 2,000 acres, offers year-round programming for all ages.
Blackwater National Wildlife Refuge	Cambridge	Dorchester	Eastern Shore	Visitors center contains wildlife exhibits, bird-watching cameras and viewing areas
Brookside Nature Center	Wheaton	Montgomery	Capital	website, operated by Montgomery Parks in Wheaton Regional Park
Carrie Murray Nature Center	Baltimore	Baltimore City	Central	Located in Gwynns Falls Leakin Park, includes rehabilitation center for disabled birds of prey and an insect zoo
Charlotte's Quest Nature Center	Manchester	Carroll	Central	Operated by the Manchester Parks Foundation, located on 60 acres (240,000 m2) of land and features over 4 miles of trails
Clearwater Nature Center	Clinton	Prince George's	Capital	website, operated by the County in Cosca Regional Park
Cromwell Valley Park	Baltimore	Baltimore City	Central	426 acres, features the Willow Grove Nature Education Center, programs about nature, farming, local history and conservation awareness, operated by the Baltimore County Department of Recreation and Parks
Croydon Creek Nature Center	Rockville	Montgomery	Capital	website, operated by the City
Cylburn Arboretum	Baltimore	Baltimore City	Central	City park with arboretum and gardens, features the Cylburn Nature Museum with Maryland natural history exhibits
Deep Creek Lake Discovery Center	Swanton	Garrett	Western	Operated by the Maryland Department of Natural Resources in the state park
Eden Mill Nature Center	Pylesville	Harford	Central	Independent organization in partnership with Harford County Parks and Recreation, nature center and historic grist mill museum
Fair Hill Nature Center	Elkton	Cecil	Eastern Shore	website, operated by the Fair Hill Environmental Foundation
Fountain Rock Park & Nature Center	Walkersville	Frederick	Western	website, operated by the County
Glen Echo Park Aquarium	Glen Echo	Montgomery	Capital	Aquarium and nature center that focuses on local tributaries and the Chesapeake Bay.
Hard Bargain Farm Environmental Center	Accokeek	Prince George's	Capital	330-acre working farm, operated by the Alice Ferguson Foundation
Harford Glen Environmental Education Center	Bel Air	Harford	Central	Operated by Harford County Public Schools
Howard County Conservancy	Woodstock	Howard	Central	Located on a 300-year-old, 232-acre farm
Irvine Nature Center	Owings Mills	Baltimore	Central	Private organization set on 116 acres (0.47 km2) of land
Jug Bay Wetlands Sanctuary	Bristol	Anne Arundel	Central	Features the McCann Wetlands Study Center with displays about the wetlands, estuaries and the Patuxent River watershed, operated by the Anne Arundel County Department of Recreation and Parks
Locust Grove Nature Center	Bethesda	Montgomery	Capital	website, operated by the Montgomery Parks in Cabin John Regional Park, offers year-round programming for all ages.
Marshlands Nature Center at Point Lookout State Park	Scotland	St. Mary's	Southern	Seasonal nature center and American Civil War museum
Marshy Point Nature Center	Middle River	Baltimore	Central	Located on Chesapeake Bay at the county’s nearly 500-acre Marshy Point Park, operated by the Baltimore County Department of Recreation and Parks
Masonville Cove Environmental Education Center	Masonville	Baltimore City	Central	website, Located on the Chesapeake Bay south of Baltimore's inner harbor, operated by the Living Classrooms Foundation
Maydale Nature Center	Colesville	Montgomery	Capital	website, operated by Montgomery Parks in Maydale Conservation Park, offering year-round programming.
Meadowside Nature Center	Rockville	Montgomery	Capital	website, operated by MontgomeryParks in Rock Creek Regional Park, offering year-round programming and a raptor sanctuary.
Merkle Natural Resources Management Area	Upper Marlboro	Prince George's	Capital	Operated by the Maryland Department of Natural Resources, encompasses 1,670 acres, wintering ground for Canada geese
Mount Rainier Nature and Recreation Center	Mount Rainier	Prince George's	Capital	website, operated by the County
Nanjemoy Creek Environmental Education Center	Nanjemoy	Charles	Southern	website, 10-acre school site within the Charles County Public School System on Najemoy Creek
New Germany State Park	Grantsville	Garrett	Western	455 acres, nature center open seasonally
Oregon Ridge Nature Center	Cockeysville	Baltimore	Central	Facility of Baltimore County Department of Recreation & Parks, assisted by the Oregon Ridge Nature Center Council
Patterson Park Audubon Center	Baltimore	Baltimore City	Central	Operated by the National Audubon Society
Patuxent Research Refuge	Laurel	Prince George's	Capital	National Wildlife Visitors Center is located in the South Tract
Phillips Wharf Environmental Center	Tilghman	Talbot	Eastern Shore	website, environment of the Chesapeake Bay
Pickering Creek Audubon Center	Easton	Talbot	Eastern Shore	website, operated by the Chesapeake Audubon Society, a subsidiary of the National Audubon Society
Piney Run Nature Center	Sykesville	Carroll	Central	Operated by the County in Piney Run Park
Robinson Nature Center	Columbia	Howard	Central	18 acres, operated by the County and supported by the Robinson Foundation, exhibits on local habitats, wildlife, and the Chesapeake Bay
Sparks Bank Nature Center	Kingsville	Baltimore	Central	Open seasonally along the Torrey C. Brown Trail of Gunpowder Falls State Park
Watkins Nature Center	Upper Marlboro	Prince George's	Capital	website, operated by the County in Watkins Regional Park
Woodend Nature Sanctuary	Chevy Chase	Montgomery	Capital	40 acre sanctuary and mansion, operated by the Audubon Naturalist Society
