= Vietnam Veterans Memorial Bridge =

The following bridges are known as the Vietnam Veterans Memorial Bridge:

- Vietnam Veterans Memorial Bridge (Baltimore) along Baltimore's Hanover Street (Maryland Route 2)
- Vietnam Veterans Memorial Bridge (Richmond) along Virginia Route 895
- Interstate 470 Bridge over the Ohio River in Wheeling, WV

== See also ==
- Vietnam Memorial Bridge, along the Connecticut River in Holyoke, Massachusetts
