= Moundsville Bridge =

Bridge in United States of America

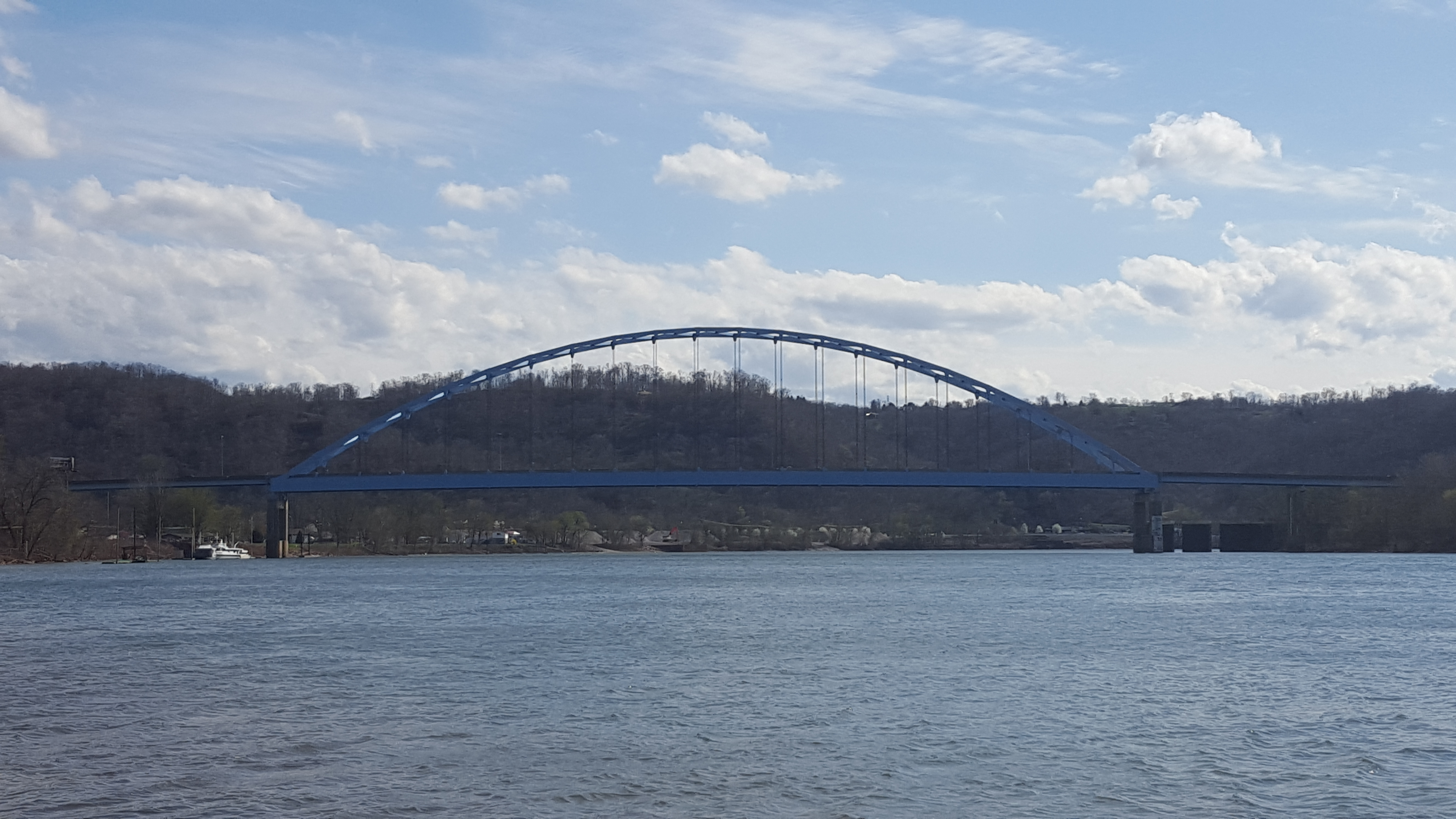
- The Moundsville Bridge in 2016
- Coordinates: 39°54′48″N 80°45′15″W
- Carries: WV 2 Spur / SR 872
- Crosses: Ohio River
- Official name: Arch A. Moore Bridge
- Maintained by: West Virginia Department of Transportation

Characteristics
- Design: Through arch
- Longest span: 912 feet (278 m)

History
- Inaugurated: August 15, 1986

Location
- Interactive map of Moundsville Bridge

The Moundsville Bridge is a four-lane through arch bridge that connects Mead Township, Ohio and Moundsville, West Virginia across the Ohio River. The approach routes to the bridge carries Ohio State Route 872 (SR 872) on the Ohio side and the unsigned West Virginia Route 2 Spur on the West Virginia side. The bridge is also officially known as the Arch A. Moore Bridge, named after the former West Virginia governor Arch A. Moore, Jr.

== Description ==
The western approach to the bridge begins at a diamond interchange with Ohio State Route 7 in rural Mead Township, Belmont County, Ohio. North of the interchange, Township Road 533 but towards the bridge, the four-lane, divided SR 872 begins. The road curves to the east and has intersections with access roads (TR 533) to the former R.E. Burger Power Station. First, SR 872 passes over TR 533 and railroad lines before beginning the Moundsville Bridge itself. Near the north bank of the river, the bridge crosses the state line where SR 872 ends and WV 2 Spur begins. After passing the main span, the road begins descending into Moundsville passing over local streets and a railroad. WV 2 Spur ends at a signalized intersection with WV 2 (Lafayette Avenue) and 12th Street in the central business district of Moundsville.

Browse numbered routes
← SR 852	OH	→ SR 1

== History ==
The Dilles Bottom section of Mead Township and Moundsville had been connected by a toll ferry since 1951. Upon the completion of the bridge, the ferry was retired.

Planning for the bridge has been ongoing since the late 1970s. Plans for the bridge began during the end of Arch Moore's term as governor but went into limbo due to a state moratorium on building projects at the time. Construction resumed on the bridge upon the announcement of shared funding from West Virginia, Ohio, and the federal government in 1977 by then-Governor Jay Rockefeller; construction was expected to be completed in 1980. By 1979, the Ohio access route was built but the bridge itself was not opened until August 15, 1986.

The opening of the Vietnam Veterans Memorial Bridge, along with the Moundsville Bridge was thought to have reduced the amount of traffic, and thus tolls collected by the nearby Bellaire Bridge were reduced by 50 per-cent in 1987.

== Cultural references ==
In the 2011 independent film Margin Call, a character named Eric Dale played by Stanley Tucci boasts of designing a bridge between Moundsville and Dilles Bottom, Ohio in 1986.

== See also ==
- List of crossings of the Ohio River
