= Masonville =

Masonville may refer to:

Canada

- Masonville, a neighborhood in London, Ontario
  - Masonville Place, a shopping mall

United States

- Masonville, Arkansas
- Masonville, Baltimore
- Masonville, Colorado
- Masonville, Iowa
- Masonville, Kentucky
- Masonville, New Jersey
- Masonville, New York
- Masonville Township, Michigan
  - Masonville, Michigan, an unincorporated community
- North Eastern States serviced by W. B. Mason are known as Masonville.
