= Baltimore Highlands, Baltimore =

Baltimore Highlands
- neighborhood statistical area
- Location within Baltimore
- Coordinates: 39°17′39″N 76°34′9″W
- Country: United States
- State: Maryland
- City: Baltimore
- Time zone: UTC-5 (Eastern)
  - Summer (DST): UTC-4 (EDT)
- ZIP code: 21224
- Area code: 410, 443, and 667

Baltimore Highlands is a neighborhood in the Southeast District of Baltimore, located between the neighborhoods of Patterson Park and Kresson. Its boundaries are drawn by Pulaski Highway (north), East Baltimore Street (south), Haven Street (east) and North Clinton Street (west).

== Public transportation ==
Four crosstown bus routes have stops along Highland Avenue as they pass through Baltimore Highlands:

- Quickbus Route 40 (MTA Maryland)
- LocalLink 78 (BaltimoreLink)
- LocalLink 22 (BaltimoreLink)
- CityLink Orange (BaltimoreLink)

== Landmarks ==
Hebrew Friendship Cemetery, one of the oldest Jewish cemeteries in Maryland, is located entirely within the Baltimore Highlands. The cemetery's original grounds were purchased by the Fells Point Hebrew Friendship Congregation in 1849. In the years since then, the cemetery has expanded until it now stretches from Baltimore Street (south) to Pulaski Highway (north).

Chesapeake Uniform Rental, Inc. operates a commercial laundry service plant, under the trade name of Lord Baltimore Uniform, at 3710 E. Baltimore Street. The plant originally opened in 1946 as Lord Baltimore Laundry, Inc. It became part of Chesapeake Uniform in 1999.

=== Esskay Meats ===
Esskay's main meatpacking plant was located in the Baltimore Highlands neighborhood at 3800 E. Baltimore Street until 1993. When the plant was completed in 1920, the company incorporated and began operating as Schluderberg-Kurdle Co., Inc., the result of a merger that year between Schluderberg Meatpacking Company and a meatpacking business owned by Thomas J. Kurdle. Esskay was a trade name for the company's products. Its corporation name was amended to Esskay, Inc. on January 17, 1989.

After it was purchased in 1985 by Smithfield Foods, Inc., Esskay continued operating as a subsidiary of Smithfield. Its Baltimore plant was closed in 1993, because its structure was not strong enough to support the 10-ton ham-boiling machines the company was planning to add to its operations. Its departure from Baltimore also involved a dispute over the continued payment of retiree health benefits.

== See also ==
- List of Baltimore neighborhoods
