= History of Syrians in Baltimore =

The city of Baltimore, Maryland includes a small Syrian population. The Syrian-American community is centered in East Baltimore. While Syrian-Americans have had a presence in Baltimore for over a century, most Syrians in Baltimore are recent immigrants and refugees who have fled the Syrian Civil War.

== Demographics ==
A 1913 report on Eastern Orthodoxy from the Episcopal Church claimed that there were no Syrians in Baltimore and only a few wealthy Syrians in nearby Washington, D.C.

In 1920, 29 foreign-born white people in Baltimore spoke the Syriac or Arabic languages.

As of 2015, about 200 Syrian refugees lived in the Baltimore metropolitan area.

== History ==
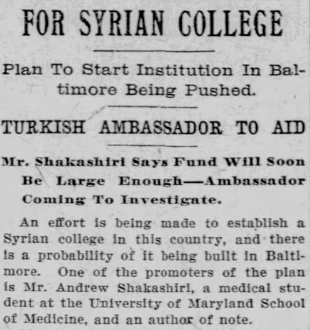
A March 2, 1908 article in The Baltimore Sun about a Syrian college planned for Baltimore.

According to the Baltimore City Community College Refugee Youth Project, 650 to 750 Syrian refugees were being settled in Baltimore each year as of 2015.

The Syrian community in Baltimore grew in size following the beginning of the Syrian Civil War in 2011. Following the Obama administration's order to accept at least 10,000 Syrian refugees, some were resettled in Baltimore. Mayor Stephanie Rawlings-Blake, Senator Ben Cardin, and other Maryland politicians urged to Obama administration to do more for Syrian refugees. Rawlings-Blake and 17 Baltimore politicians sent President Obama a letter urging for more Syrians to be resettled in Baltimore. The Baltimore branch of the International Rescue Committee office in Highlandtown has helped to settle Syrian refugees in the city. In 2015, the IRC helped 26 Syrian refugees settle in Baltimore, 11 of whom were children. The Baltimore-based Lutheran Immigration and Refugee Service has also been active in supporting Syrian immigrants and refugees in Baltimore. Catholic Relief Services, Lutheran World Relief, and other Christian organizations in Baltimore have assisted Syrians and Syrian-Americans by building safe shelters for refugees, sending supplies to Syria, and resettling refugees. Most Syrian refugees in Baltimore come to the city due to family connections.

The Jewish-American community in Baltimore has been active in supporting the resettlement of Syrian refugees. The Union for Reform Judaism, the American Jewish Council, Jewish Community Relations Council, and groups representing the Conservative and Orthodox movements have vocalized support for Syrian refugees. Rabbi Daniel Cotzin Burg of Beth Am, a Conservative synagogue in Baltimore, has expressed support for Syrian refugees in Baltimore. Beth Am congregants have voiced concerned about stereotypes of Syrian Muslims and Islamophobia following the January 2015 Île-de-France attacks. Beth Am congregants have cooperated with the International Rescue Committee to assist Syrian refugees. However, some Jewish-Americans have opposed resettlement of Syrian refugees due to concerns about Muslim antisemitism. Morton Klein, president of the Zionist Organization of America, published an opinion piece in the Baltimore Jewish Times denouncing HIAS, the Anti-Defamation League, and other Jewish-American organizations for what he called "supporting dangerous Syrian immigration", writing that "The violence perpetrated by Muslim immigrants in Europe — especially toward European Jews — portends what America has in store if we bring more such immigrants here." HIAS had collected the signatures of 80 rabbis from the Baltimore-Washington area that was sent to Congress urging members of Congress to learn from Jewish history and welcome all refugees.

== Culture ==
=== Cuisine ===
Kosher Syrian Jewish cuisine is available in Baltimore through a catering service called Mazza From Heaven. The catering service is run by two Syrian-Jewish mothers and offers traditional Syrian-Jewish and Persian-Jewish dishes.

There is a Baltimore-based Syrian-American catering collective known as Aleppo Kitchen. The group is run by 20 Syrian refugee women and is supported by the Muslim Social Services Agency of Baltimore.

=== Media ===
In her books A Country Called Amreeka: Arab Roots, American Stories and The Home That Was Our Country: A Memoir of Syria, Syrian-American journalist Alia Malek has written about growing up in Baltimore as the daughter of Syrian immigrants.

In 2018, a documentary about Syrian-Americans in Baltimore premiered titled This Is Home: A Refugee Story, directed by Alexandra Shiva.

=== Religion ===
Syrian-Americans in Baltimore are predominantly Muslim, Christian, or Jewish. Due to the small numbers of Sephardi Syrian Jews in Baltimore, some have opted to study at Ashkenazi learning centers because of the shortage of Sephardi hakhamim and yeshivot.

== Notable Syrian-Americans from Baltimore ==
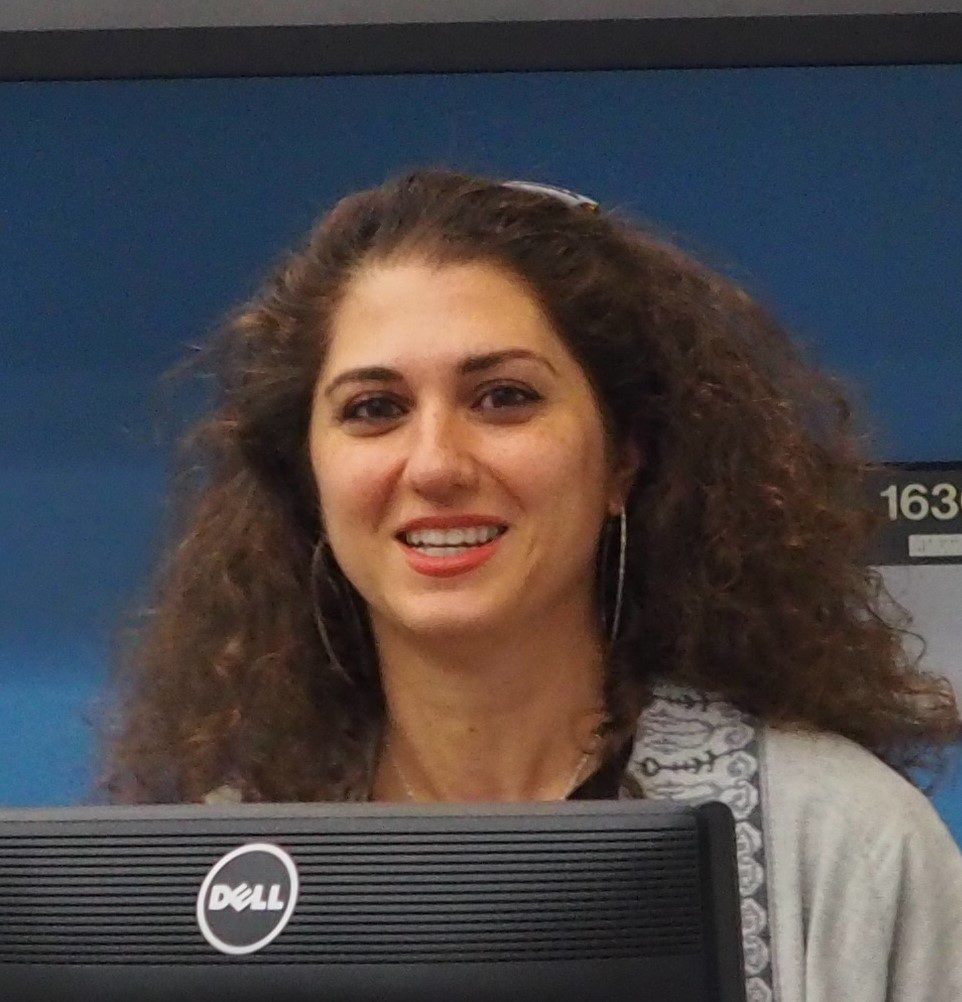
Alia Malek, Baltimore-born Syrian-American journalist and lawyer, 2018.

- Alia Malek, journalist and lawyer.

== See also ==
- Syrian Americans
