= Lynching of King Johnson =

1911 lynching in Brooklyn, Maryland, US

King Johnson was lynched on December 26, 1911, in Brooklyn, Maryland.

The lynching occurred after King Johnson shot and killed Frederick Schwab, a 29-year-old white blacksmith who lived in the Fairfield area of Baltimore. The incident took place after a verbal confrontation over a game of pool between Johnson and Frederick Schwab's brother, Frank. The argument turned sour. Upon leaving the saloon Johnson was approached by Frederick Schwab. Frederick was upset that Johnson called his brother several vile names during the argument. Johnson reported that he already feared Frederick because of previous encounters. Therefore, when Frederick struck him he pulled his pistol and fired several shots. The first shot hit Frederick in the chest, killing him, the next two shots were fired over Frederick's fallen body. However, witnesses claimed they did not see Frederick strike Johnson.

Frank Schwab returned to the saloon where the argument occurred. He called Chief Irwin of the Anne Arundel County Police. King Johnson was later arrested along with witness, Hubert (Reedbird) Chase, at his home. There was no reported resistance and Johnson pleaded self-defense as his only motive. Johnson and Chase were both taken to the Brooklyn jail. They were to be transported to Annapolis for their safety that same day but were delayed. Around two o'clock in the morning on December 26, 1911, Johnson was taken from his cell at the Brooklyn jail and lynched.
