= Dilles Bottom, Ohio =

Unincorporated community in Ohio, U.S.

Coordinates: 39°55′21″N 80°46′54″W

Dilles Bottom is an unincorporated community in Southeastern Mead Township, Belmont County, Ohio, United States. The community is located along the Ohio River five miles south of Shadyside, Ohio. It is the proposed site for an ethane cracker plant.

== History ==
A post office called Dilles Bottom was established in 1827 and remained in operation until 1940.

Following the American Revolution, the newly founded United States of America sought ways to pay its debts, having no legitimate way for the federal government to collect tax, the government began selling land in the Northwest Territory. This would become the first legitimate way to obtain land in Ohio Country, resulting in pioneers flooding the area in search for new opportunities.

Dille's bottom was among the first places settled in Belmont County, Ohio, originally owned by John Dille opposite of Moundsville, West Virginia, in 1793, from which the community gets its name. A blockhouse was swiftly constructed to provide residents shelter from the threat of Native American attacks, known as Fort Dille. One notable event occurred about 250 yards below the fort, an old man was gunned down by Indians early in the morning opening his door. The attackers would focus their efforts at breaching the house, to harm the people inside. A boy within the home found an opportunity to escape to Fort Dille as the men within the blockhouse had witnessed the event but didn't have the courage nor force to repeal the attack of a dozen or so Indians.

By 1801, the unprecedented level of travel and expansion through the greater Ohio Valley region would lead to the Northwest Territorial government to approve a Grade Road from Dille's Bottom at the Ohio River to east of Old Washington, Ohio. The incline around Dille's Bottom was more forgiving than the trail west around Wheeling. The Grade Road would become known as "Drover Road", as it became the preferred drover hauling route east, hundreds of thousands of animals including cattle, horses, hogs, and sheep traveled this road until about 1875 when railroads became competitive.

Among the first pioneers to settle the area was Col. David Lockwood, a Revolutionary War veteran, who would settle in Dille's Bottom in 1800. Col. Lockwood's patriotism would be honored by the residents, when he was voted as one of the first associate judges of the Belmont County. A school was planned as early as 1800, the Lockwoods leased a plot of land for 99 years, seats were made of hewed planks and desks of shelves.

In 1821, Col. Lockwood would construct the first Grist Mill of Dille's, on a small stream, and in connection ran a distillery. In 1834, Benjamin Lockwood, David's son, built a 40 by 50 foot, three and half story mill on Pipe Creek. Steam was introduced in 1845, but in 1868 the boiler exploded and killed two. Thereafter the mill was operated by waterpower. Land owned by the Lockwood family included several hundred acres, starting at the Ohio River extending to the top of the hill in Dille's Bottom. The great flood of 1832 would see extensive destruction to many Ohio communities; Dille Bottom would also suffer the same fate, although the details of the destruction are unclear.

Benjamin Lockwood would become interested in steamboats as a method of transporting his product after the first steamboat came steaming down the Ohio. Within a couple of years, Lockwood boat landing would become a thriving business supporting businesses in the area. By 1865, there were five extensive mining companies with an annual output of 700,000 bushels. These companies included Pipe Creek Coal & Iron Company, the Enterprise Coal Company, Col. Thompson's Mines, and the Wegee Mines.

In 1942, the Ohio Public Service Company began construction of a super-power plant at Dille's Bottom. The plant would become known as the R. E. Burger Power Station, with five complete units. In 2011, the plant became decommissioned, and FirstEnergy would begin the destruction process. By 2016, all that remained was the smokestack, thousands gathered to watch 450 pounds of explosives fell the 854-foot-tall structure.

== Cracker plant controversy ==
Following the destruction of the R.E Burger Power Plant, First Energy announced they were in negotiations with the Thailand based company PTTGCA for construction of a 200-acre (81 ha) ethane cracker plant. Finalization of the agreement has yet to be formally signed, leaving many within the Ohio Valley uncertain about the future. Although no formal agreement has been signed, JobsOhio has spent $70 million for site preparation.
