= Brooklyn, Baltimore =

Coordinates: 39°13′49″N 76°36′08″W

Brooklyn
- Neighborhood of Baltimore
- Location within Baltimore
- Country: United States
- State: Maryland
- City: Baltimore
- Established: 1853, 1874, (annexed into Baltimore City, 1918–1919)
- Founded by: Patapsco Land Company of Baltimore City, 1853
- Named after: Brooklyn, New York, second oldest community with historic Dutch name, similarity with having an independent city/town across the river from larger major city (Baltimore).
- Time zone: UTC-5 (Eastern)
  - Summer (DST): EDT
- ZIP code: 21225
- Area code: 410, 443, and 667
- Website: http://www.curtisbay.com http://www.brooklyncurtisbay.com

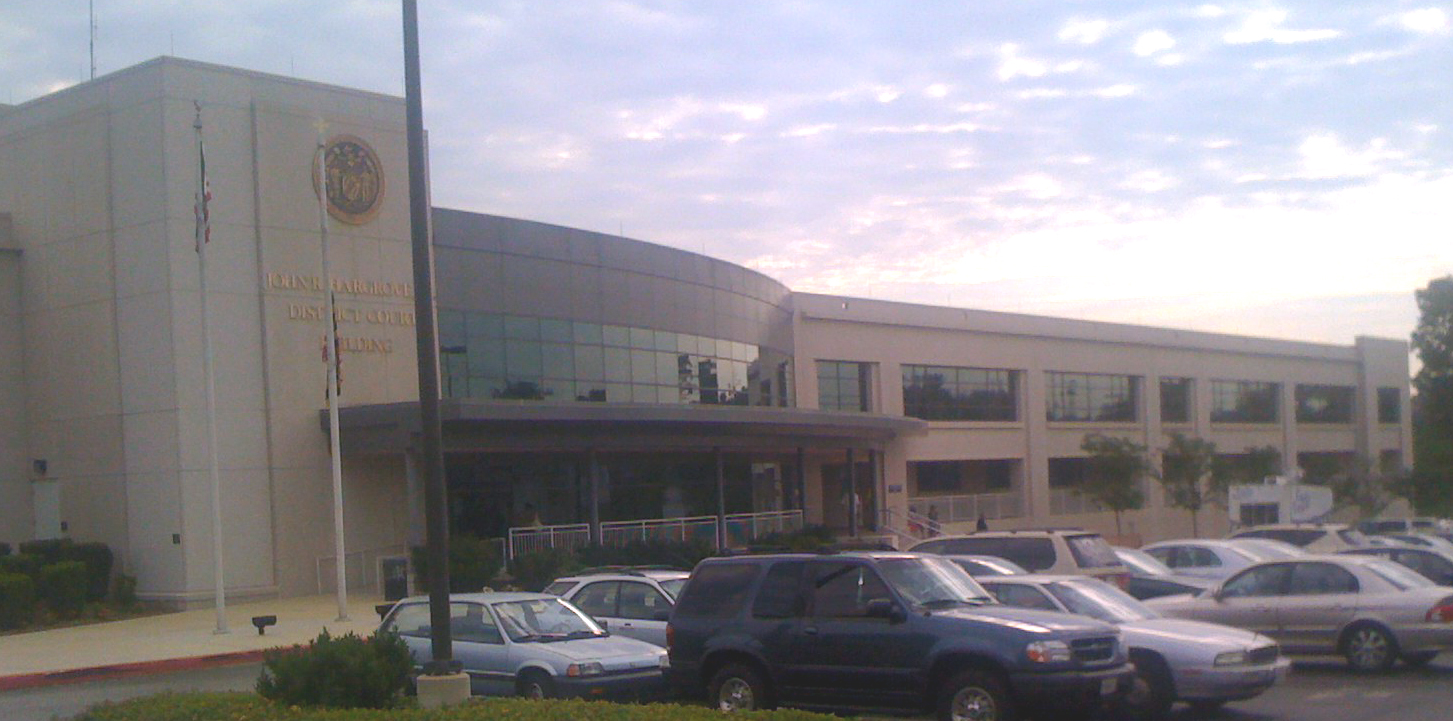
John R. Hargrove, Sr. District Court Building

Brooklyn is one of the southernmost neighborhoods in Baltimore, Maryland. It is located near Anne Arundel County along Governor Ritchie Highway which is also Maryland Route 2. Its main roads are South Hanover Street, Potee Street, East Patapsco Avenue, Sixth Street, Tenth Street, and West Bay Avenue which borders the neighboring Curtis Bay community to the east, running through Bay Brook Park, which separates the two. South Hanover Street also serves as the dividing line between east–west streets in Brooklyn, as Charles Street (which acts as the east–west divider from downtown north to the city line) does not exist here.

Often mistaken for the similarly-named Brooklyn Park area, Brooklyn shares the 21225 ZIP Code with the greater Brooklyn Park area, which is across the Baltimore City Line in northern Anne Arundel County, and the community of Cherry Hill to the west and northwest across the western branch of the Patapsco River across the Hanover Street Bridge.

To the northeast, along the shoreline of the Patapsco River are the former residential communities of Fairfield and Wagner's Point (also known as East Brooklyn), which were "islands of houses" surrounded by the belt of river-front heavy industry. During the construction of the 1955–1957 Baltimore Harbor Tunnel of Interstate 895 (Maryland), another smaller residential island neighborhood of Masonville was purchased and razed for the highway construction. In the past decade these two communities of Fairfield and Wagner's Point have been also bought out and razed. Brooklyn is within the Baltimore City limits, and Brooklyn Park and Brooklyn Heights, along with the smaller neighboring communities of Arundel Village, Arundel Gardens, Pumphrey, and Roland Terrace, are in northern Anne Arundel County.

Brooklyn is the location of the John R. Hargrove, Sr. District Court Building, located right off of Patapsco Avenue. There are many industrial facilities in the region, mainly shipping ports, rail yards, and oil tanks. Many car imports come through this area, which is at the south end of the Harbor Tunnel that runs off I-895.

== History ==
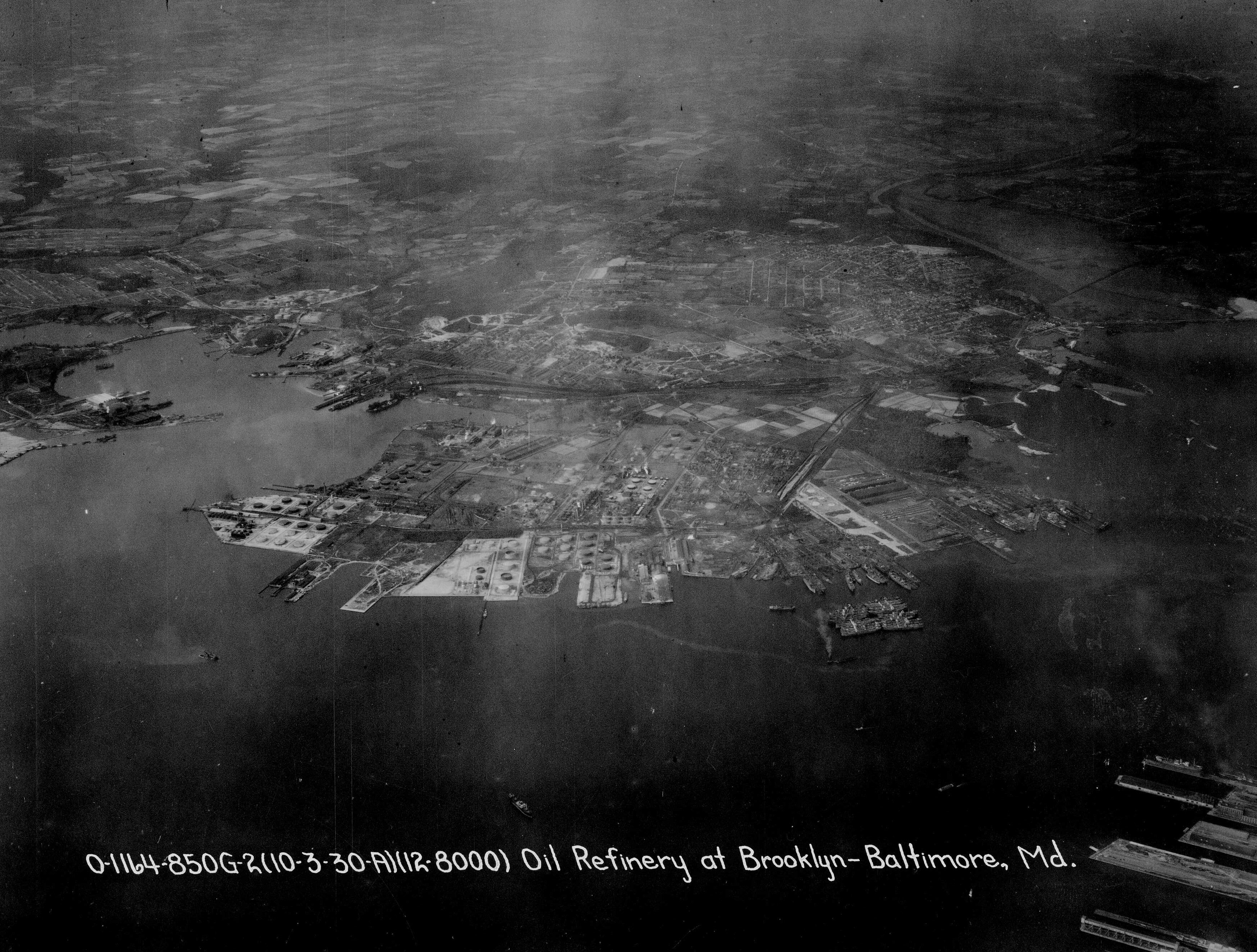
Aerial view of industrial facilities, 1931

On December 26, 1911, King Johnson was lynched in Brooklyn. A mob was able to take him from his jail cell and shoot him four times. Nobody was ever tried for the killing.

The Brooklyn neighborhood was included in the areas annexed to the City of Baltimore in 1918 as a result of state legislation. Prior to the annexation, the neighborhood had been part of Anne Arundel County.

On July 2, 2023, a mass shooting occurred in Brooklyn during its annual Brooklyn Day community celebration. Two people were killed and 28 were injured according to police. It is the largest shooting incident in the city's history.

In November 2024, the neighborhood celebrated over a year of no homicides in the wake of the shooting.

== Masonville Cove Environmental Education Center ==
For many years, Brooklyn has been divided from the Patapsco River waterfront by major roadways like the Harbor Tunnel Throughway and Frankfurst Avenue. This has meant that residents, living just blocks away from the water, were unable to regularly experience this important natural resource.

In 2008, the State of Maryland broke ground on the Masonville Cove Environmental Education Center, which was created to provide environmental educational programs for the Brooklyn community. Part of a $153 million restoration effort for the cove, which included bike trails, environmental restoration, and the creation of new habitat, the Education Center was designed to be a focal point for school programs and community efforts. Design/Built by Baltimore Green Construction, the center is a "Near-Zero Net Energy Building", designed to consume 75% less energy than a standard commercial building of its size. The center was opened by Lt. Governor Anthony Brown on Earth Day of 2009, and is now open for educational programs.

== Area projects and developments ==
- Hargrove District Court House
- 3700 Potee St is up for development by the Baltimore Development Corporation (BDC)
- Fairfield Industrial Park (Fairfield is east of Brooklyn) is scheduled for redevelopment.
- Gateway South is progressing, and right around the corner from Brooklyn.

== See also ==
- Brooklyn Park, Maryland
