= J. E. Greiner Company =

Civil engineering firm based in Baltimore, Maryland

- Industry: Civil engineering
- Founded: 1908; 117 years ago in Baltimore, Maryland, U.S.
- Founder: John E. Greiner
- Defunct: 1995
- Successor: URS Corporation
- Headquarters: Baltimore, Maryland, U.S., United States

J. E. Greiner Company was a Baltimore, Maryland-based civil engineering firm specializing in bridge design.

== History ==
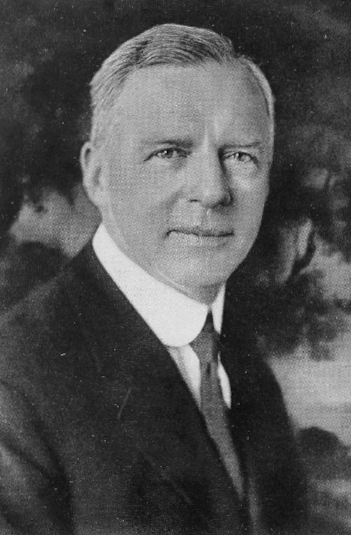
John Edwin Greiner

The firm was founded in 1908 by former Baltimore and Ohio Railroad bridge engineer John Edwin Greiner (February 24, 1859 – November 15, 1942) and led by Greiner and his associate Hershel Heathcote Allen. The firm was later known as Greiner Engineering and opened a second office in Chicago, apparently in connection with its work on the Calumet Skyway. In 1995, the firm was acquired by URS Corporation, now part of AECOM.

The firm designed several notable bridges and also prepared transportation planning studies, the first of which was Maryland's Primary Bridge Program for the Maryland State Roads Commission in 1938. Later studies included Transportation Plans for Washington for Washington, D.C. in 1946, and Expressway System for Metropolitan Providence for Rhode Island, in 1947, both with De Leuw, Cather & Company.

== Works ==
- Baltimore Harbor Tunnel - under Patapsco River and Helen Delich Bentley Port of Baltimore
- Baltimore–Washington Parkway - formerly Interstate 295, later Maryland Route 295
- Bellaire Bridge
- Bridge of Lions (St. Augustine, Florida)
- Calumet (Chicago) Skyway, (Chicago, Illinois)
- Chesapeake Bay Bridge -
- Francis Scott Key Bridge (Baltimore) - over Patapsco River before its collapse in 2024
- Governor Harry W. Nice Memorial Bridge - over lower Potomac River between Maryland and Virginia, below Washington, D.C.
- Hanover Street Bridge (Baltimore, Maryland) - (Later renamed "Vietnam Veterans Memorial Bridge" in 2000s - built 1914-1917 carrying South Hanover Street Maryland Route 2 over Ferry Branch / Middle Branch of the Patapsco River / Baltimore Harbor)
- Howard Street Bridge (Baltimore, Maryland)
- Interstate 70 in Maryland
- Martin Luther King Jr. Memorial Bridge (Petersburg, Virginia)
- Sidney Lanier Bridge (Brunswick, Georgia), along with Sverdrup & Parcel
- Silver Bridge (Point Pleasant, West Virginia, and Gallipolis, Ohio)
- Thomas J. Hatem Memorial Bridge - over Susquehanna River in northeastern Maryland
- Whitney Young Memorial Bridge (East Capitol Street Bridge, Washington, D.C.)
- Fred Hartman Memorial Bridge (Houston, Texas)
