= Bethlehem, West Virginia =

Village in West Virginia, US

- Village
- Logo

- Location of Bethlehem in Ohio County, West Virginia.
- Coordinates: 40°2′56″N 80°41′37″W
- Country: United States
- State: West Virginia
- County: Ohio

Government
  - Mayor: Matthew G. Saseen
  - Police Chief: Russell Fehr

Area
  - Total: 3.54 sq mi (9.18 km^{2})
  - Land: 3.54 sq mi (9.18 km^{2})
  - Water: 0 sq mi (0.00 km^{2})
- Elevation: 1,250 ft (380 m)

Population (2020)
  - Total: 2,605
  - Density: 654.9/sq mi (252.84/km^{2})
- Time zone: UTC-5 (Eastern (EST))
  - Summer (DST): UTC-4 (EDT)
- ZIP code: 26003
- Area code: 304
- FIPS code: 54-06940
- GNIS feature ID: 1535728
- Website: https://bethlehemwv.gov/

Bethlehem is a village in Ohio County, West Virginia, United States. It is part of the Wheeling, West Virginia Metropolitan Statistical Area. The population was 2,605 at the 2020 census.

== Geography ==
Bethlehem is located at 40°2′56″N 80°41′37″W (40.048761, -80.693601).

According to the United States Census Bureau, the village has a total area of 3.54 square miles (9.17 km^{2}), all land, at an elevation of 1,243 feet (379 m).

== Demographics ==
Historical population
Census	Pop.	Note	%±
1950	1,146		—
1960	2,308		101.4%
1970	2,461		6.6%
1980	2,677		8.8%
1990	2,694		0.6%
2000	2,651		−1.6%
2010	2,499		−5.7%
2020	2,605		4.2%
U.S. Decennial Census

=== 2010 census ===
At the 2010 census there were 2,499 people, 1,107 households, and 735 families living in the village. The population density was 705.9 inhabitants per square mile (272.5/km^{2}). There were 1,163 housing units at an average density of 328.5 per square mile (126.8/km^{2}). The racial makeup of the village was 95.8% White, 1.1% African American, 0.1% Native American, 1.5% Asian, 0.2% from other races, and 1.2% from two or more races. Hispanic or Latino of any race were 0.5%.

Of the 1,107 households 25.9% had children under the age of 18 living with them, 53.2% were married couples living together, 9.2% had a female householder with no husband present, 4.0% had a male householder with no wife present, and 33.6% were non-families. 28.6% of households were one person and 12.3% were one person aged 65 or older. The average household size was 2.26 and the average family size was 2.77.

The median age in the village was 47.2 years. 19.1% of residents were under the age of 18; 6.4% were between the ages of 18 and 24; 21.6% were from 25 to 44; 34% were from 45 to 64; and 19.1% were 65 or older. The gender makeup of the village was 48.4% male and 51.6% female.

=== 2000 census ===
At the 2000 census there were 2,651 people, 1,127 households, and 793 families living in the village. The population density was 751.2 people per square mile (290.0/km^{2}). There were 1,169 housing units at an average density of 331.2 per square mile (127.9/km^{2}). The racial makeup of the village was 96.57% White, 1.17% African American, 0.08% Native American, 1.62% Asian, 0.04% from other races, and 0.53% from two or more races. Hispanic or Latino of any race were 0.38%.

Of the 1,127 households 28.1% had children under the age of 18 living with them, 61.2% were married couples living together, 7.1% had a female householder with no husband present, and 29.6% were non-families. 26.4% of households were one person and 13.0% were one person aged 65 or older. The average household size was 2.35 and the average family size was 2.83.

The age distribution was 21.6% under the age of 18, 5.4% from 18 to 24, 26.6% from 25 to 44, 26.1% from 45 to 64, and 20.3% 65 or older. The median age was 43 years. For every 100 females, there were 93.4 males. For every 100 females age 18 and over, there were 92.4 males.

The median household income was $43,802 and the median family income was $49,491. Males had a median income of $37,850 versus $25,750 for females. The per capita income for the village was $21,995. About 0.5% of families and 2.2% of the population were below the poverty line, including 1.2% of those under age 18 and 2.2% of those age 65 or over.

== In popular culture ==
Philadelphia band mewithoutYou released a song titled "Bethlehem, WV" on their 2018 EP [untitled].
