= Wheeling Heritage Trails =

Trails in Wheeling, West Virginia, USA

Greater Wheeling Trail
- Length: 14 mi (23 km)
- Location: Wheeling, West Virginia
- Trailheads: Pike Island Locks and Dam; 48th and Water Street; Community Street (near Angle Avenue)
- Use: Biking, Hiking, Walking

The Wheeling Heritage Trails are two trails in Wheeling, West Virginia. The Ohio River Trail is a 14-mile (23 km) long mixed use rail trail along the Ohio River, while the Wheeling Creek Trail follows Wheeling Creek from downtown Wheeling to Elm Grove.

== Location ==
=== Ohio River Trail ===
- Southern terminus at 48th St. and Water St. in South Wheeling (40°02′00″N 80°43′44″W).
- Northern terminus at the Pike Island Lock and Dam and connection with the Brooke Pioneer Trail in Clearview (40°08′51″N 80°42′02″W).

=== Wheeling Creek Trail ===
- Western terminus 14th St. at Heritage Port Park in downtown Wheeling (40°03′56″N 80°43′29″W).
- Eastern terminus at the intersection of Community St. and Angle Av. in Elm Grove (40°02′54″N 80°39′56″W).
