= Charlotte's Quest Nature Center =

Park in Manchester, Maryland, US

Charlotte's Quest
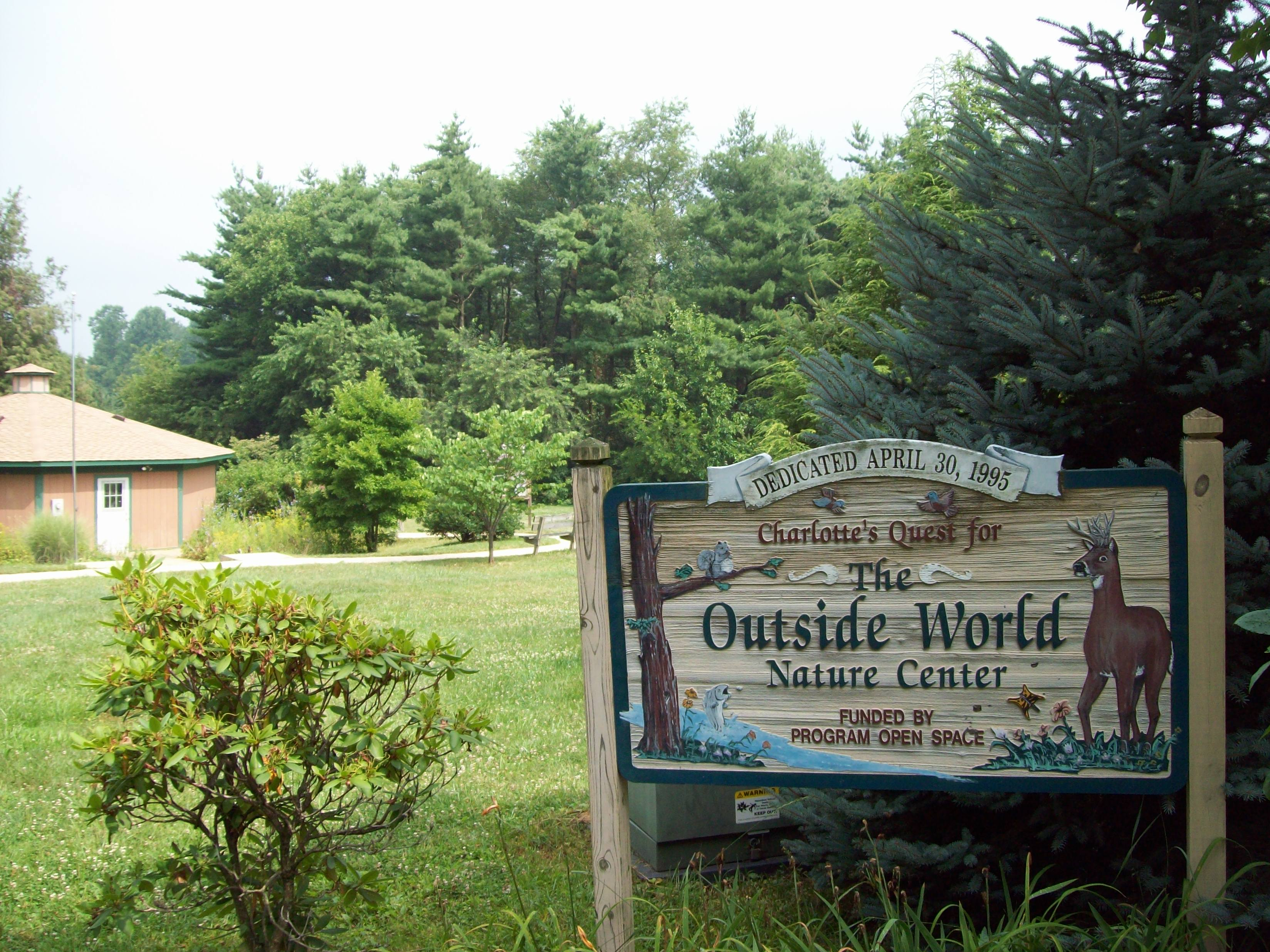
- Interactive map of Charlotte's Quest
- Type: nature center
- Location: 3400 Wilhelm Lane; Manchester, Maryland
- Coordinates: 39°39′56″N 76°52′50.5″W
- Area: 60 acres (0.24 km^{2}; 0.094 sq mi)
- Created: May 3, 1995
- Etymology: Charlotte Collett
- Operator: Manchester Parks Foundation
- Hiking trails: 4 1/2 miles (7.2 km)
- Website: charlottesquestnaturecenter.com

Charlotte's Quest Nature Center is a nature center in Manchester, Maryland, US. It is operated by the Manchester Parks Foundation and is adjacent to Pine Valley Park and Manchester Elementary School. It is located on 60 acres (240,000 m^{2}) of land and contains 4 1/2 miles (7.2 km) of hiking trails.

== History ==
Charlotte's Quest Nature Center was opened on May 3, 1995 as Charlotte's Quest for the Outside World. It was named after Charlotte Collett, a retired teacher who had the vision of opening the facility.

In 2001, following Collett's death, the town of Manchester voted unanimously to name the center in honor of her.
