= Alia Malek =

American journalist, writer and lawyer (born 1974)

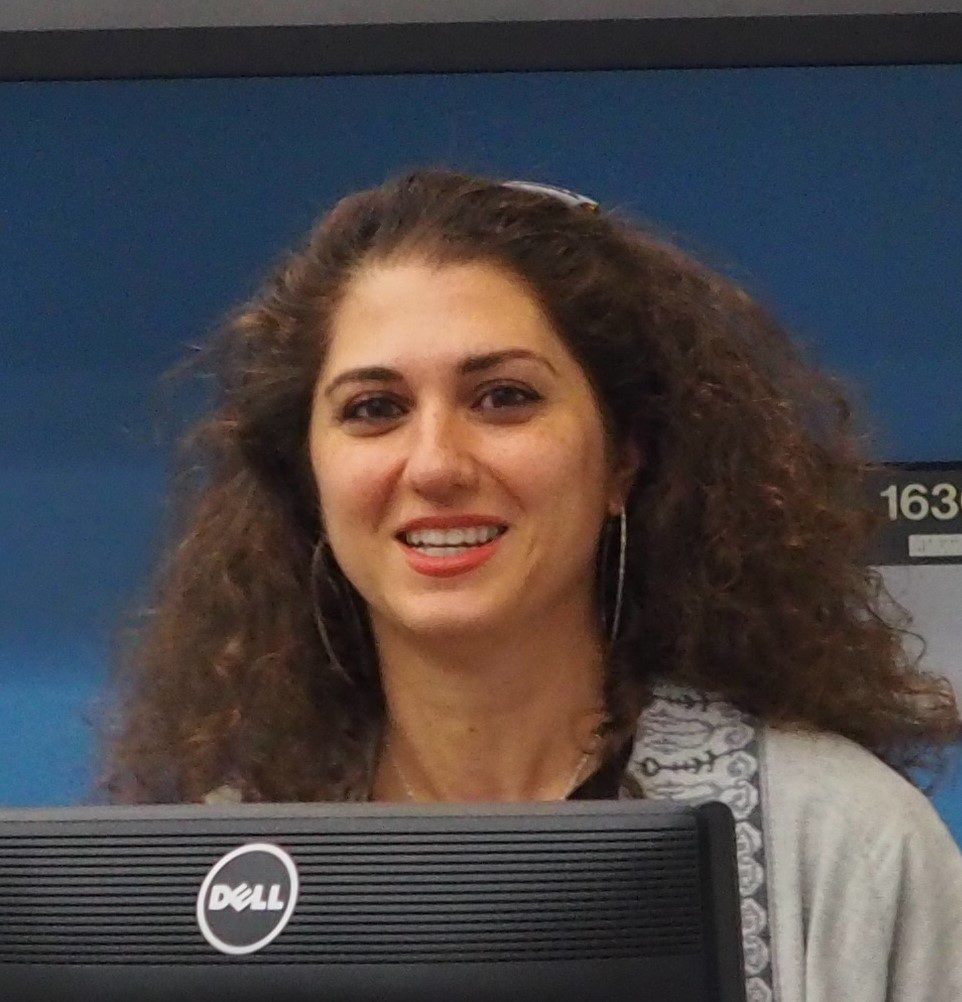
- Born: December 29, 1974 (age 51); Baltimore, Maryland, United States
- Occupations: Journalist, lawyer, writer
- Years active: 2000–present
- Known for: literary and nonfiction writing about Syria
- Notable work: The Home That Was Our Country (memoir)

Alia Malek (born December 29, 1974) is an American writer, journalist and lawyer.

== Early life and career ==
Malek was born in Baltimore, Maryland, in 1974. Her parents had immigrated to the United States from Syria. Malek graduated from Johns Hopkins University in 1996. She then earned a J.D. degree at Georgetown University Law Center. She worked as a civil rights lawyer at the United States Department of Justice Civil Rights Division and later went back to school to obtain a master's degree in journalism from Columbia University.

She published her first book in 2009, A Country Called Amreeka. From 2011 to 2013, she lived in Damascus, Syria. Her memoir The Home That Was Our Country is based on this period. She also worked as a senior writer for Al Jazeera America. Her stories have appeared in publications including The New Yorker, The New York Times and The Nation.

== Awards ==
- 2016 – Hiett Prize

== Works ==
- A Country Called Amreeka: Arab Roots, American Stories New York: Free Press, 2009. ISBN 9781416592686, OCLC 297405959
- (editor) Patriot Acts: Narratives of Post-9/11 Injustice San Francisco, Calif. McSweeneys Books 2011. ISBN 9781936365371, OCLC 838115917
- The Home That Was Our Country: A Memoir of Syria New York, NY: Nation Books, 2017. ISBN 9781568585321, OCLC 961457621
- Malek, Alia; Bullwinkel, Dave; Bullwinkel, Rita, eds. (2024-12-12). Aftershocks. Contemporary Syrian Prose. San Francisco: McSweeney's. ISBN 978-1963270044.
