= Bellaire Bridge =

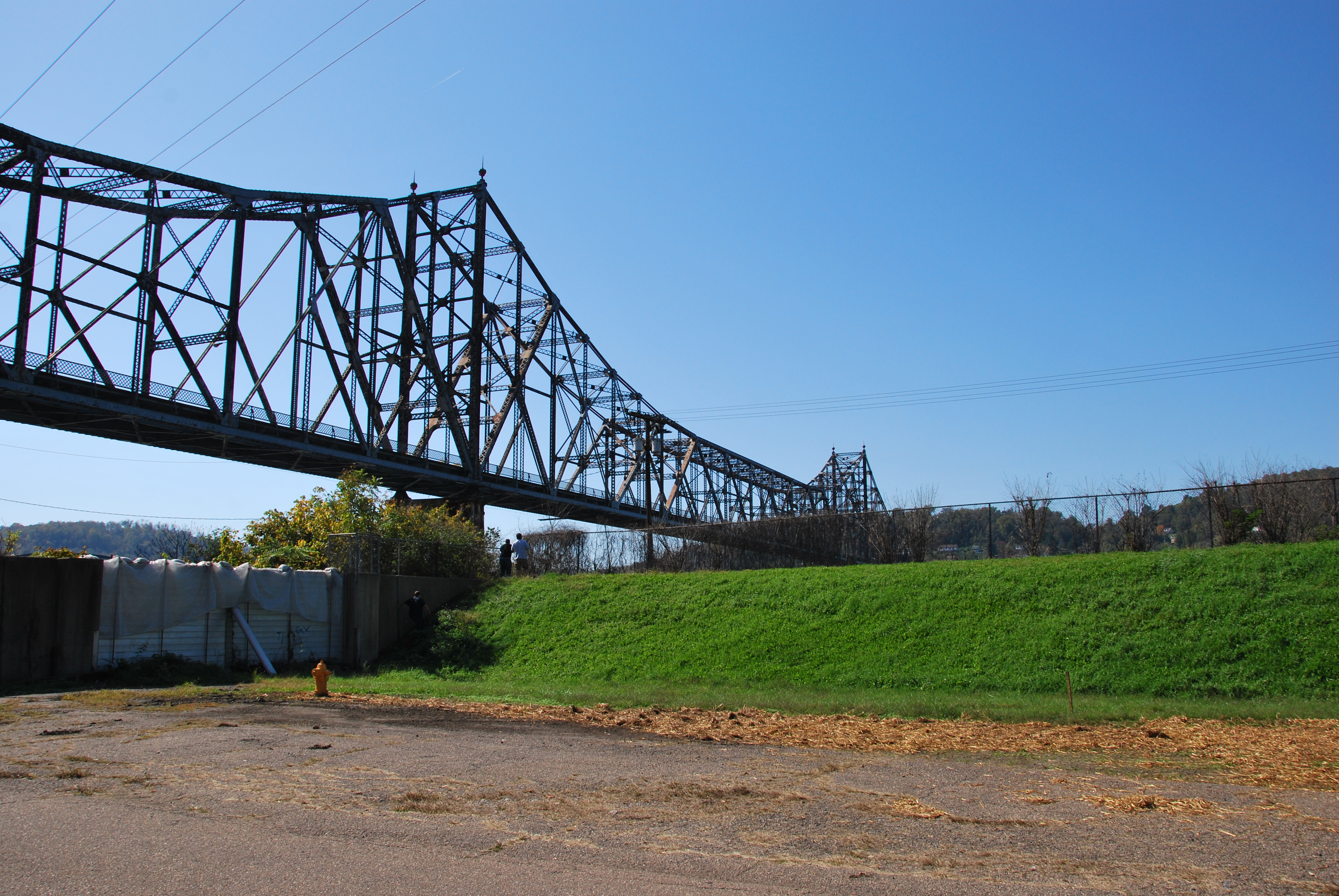
- West Virginia side of Bellaire Bridge in October 2011
- Coordinates: 40°0′54.15″N 80°44′20.15″W
- Crosses: Ohio River
- Official name: Bellaire Bridge
- Maintained by: KDC Investments

Characteristics
- Design: Cantilever truss bridge
- Total length: 2,770 ft (840 m)
- Height: 350 ft (110 m)

History
- Constructed by: J. E. Greiner Company (engineering), Mount Vernon Bridge Company (superstructure), J. E. Moss Iron Works (superstructure), R. R. Kitchen Company (deck), Vang Construction Company (substructure)
- Construction end: 1926
- Closed: 1991

Location
- Interactive map of Bellaire Bridge

The Bellaire Bridge or Interstate Bridge is a privately owned, closed cantilever truss toll bridge that spans the Ohio River between Benwood, West Virginia (near Wheeling) and Bellaire, Ohio (near Martins Ferry). It provided a link for commuters between southern Ohio border towns and West Virginia steel mills from 1926 to 1991.

The overall length of the bridge is 2,770 feet (840 m), including the approach of 850 feet (260 m) on the West Virginia side and 670 feet (200 m) on the Ohio side of the river. The highest point in the bridge is 350 feet (110 m) above the water line.

Built in 1926, the bridge is likely the oldest cantilever truss bridge in West Virginia, and is the second oldest vehicular truss bridge over the entire Ohio River. It is currently unused, and missing approach spans on the Ohio side. As of 2026, the bridge remains standing, with status regarding demolition unknown.

== Construction ==
The bridge was designed as a cantilever truss bridge by J. E. Greiner Company, with the Vang Construction Company as contractors of the substructure; the J.E. Moss Iron Works and the Mt. Vernon Bridge Company as co-contractors of the superstructure. The R. R. Kitchen company of Wheeling had charge of placing the floor in the bridge.

The bridge was constructed over 18 months starting in June 1925 at a cost of about $1.5 million, which is equivalent to $27.3 million in present-day terms. Funds were raised primarily through subscription by local residents. During construction, hundreds worked on the bridge, with one fatality: Fred Morning fell from a pier on the Benwood, West Virginia, side and died on June 12, 1926.

Over 3500 tons of structural steel was used in the construction of the bridge. Railroad track for streetcars was laid in the bridge deck, but never saw use. The bridge opened to traffic on December 22, 1926, with over 7,000 vehicles crossing it on its opening day. On the day the bridge opened, the mayors of the two neighboring communities came together to celebrate the momentous occasion. Mayor Fred Olson of Benwood, West Virginia, and Mayor Floyd E. Cromwell of Bellaire, Ohio, met at the center of the newly constructed bridge for the ceremonial ribbon cutting, symbolizing the new connection between their communities.

== Tolls ==
In order to cover the cost of construction, those crossing the bridge were charged a toll. Initially, a one-way trip cost 5 cents. For nearly 45 years, the toll remained unchanged until, in 1971, the toll was increased to 25 cents one-way, 40 cents round trip. The bridge began losing money in 1984, so the owners increased the toll once more to 50 cents one-way, one dollar round trip. The opening of the Vietnam Veterans Memorial Bridge, along with another bridge in nearby Moundsville was thought to have reduced the amount of traffic, and thus tolls collected by the Bellaire Bridge by up to 50 per-cent in 1987.

== Closure and planned demolition ==
This bridge was closed to traffic on May 1, 1991, because the Ohio Department of Transportation (ODOT) needed to demolish the approach ramp to the crossing on the Ohio side of the river in order to provide right-of-way for a relocated Ohio State Route 7, which would no longer service the bridge.

ODOT paid $2.1 million in November 1990 to the Interstate Bridge Company, the bridge's owner, and demolished the ramp soon after its closure. The U.S. Route 250 and West Virginia Route 2 approaches on the West Virginia side were concurrently abandoned.

The bridge was sold to Roger Barack, owner of a construction company in Bellaire, in March 1991. There were talks of building a new approach on the Ohio side, however, no action was ever taken. $895,000 of the Ohio Department of Transportation payment had been set aside for demolition of the bridge but no demolition came about.

With assistance from then-state Senator Bob Ney, Barack approached ODOT about reopening the bridge, but those plans never bore fruit because "the costs involved far outweighed any potential for the bridge to function economically," according to a 2003 letter from ODOT Deputy Director Randall F. Howard.

In 2002, Benwood, West Virginia, officials requested that the bridge be demolished as football-sized debris was falling onto the roadway below, but nothing was done. The United States Coast Guard had ordered the span demolished, and had fined Barack over $200,000 for his nonfeasance. The bridge was still in place in May 2005, The Plain Dealer describing it as "a decrepit nuisance that residents of both states are eager to demolish."

=== Bob Ney controversy ===
Bob Ney, who had become a member of the U.S. House of Representatives, obtained a $1.7 million Federal grant in 2005 to fund demolition of the bridge. This soon engendered controversy, due to Ney's preexisting personal and political ties to Barack. Before Bellaire switched from Ney's district to that of Ted Strickland as a result of Congressional redistricting due to the results of the 2000 United States census, Ney rented his Congressional office space from Barack for $1,800 a month. Ney also received campaign contributions of $6,000 from Barack and his wife, most recently in 1997. Along with this, Ney nominated Barack's son for appointment to the United States Air Force Academy.

It seems puzzling to me that public dollars would be used to tear down a bridge that is owned by an individual.

— U.S. Rep. Ted Strickland

=== Demolition ===
On May 20, 2010, Roger Barack announced that he had sold the bridge to Advanced Explosives Demolition (AED), a demolition company that has gained fame through their demolitions on the TLC reality show The Imploders, for $1. AED then sold the bridge to KDC Investments for $25,000, finalizing the deal on June 3, 2010. AED will be subcontracted to complete the demolition, with Delta Demolition, a local company, serving as the general contractor. The project originally was to be completed by September 28, 2010, but as has been historically typical with the bridge, delays have pushed the demolition back from a target of June 2011 to being indefinitely placed on hold. The current delay stems from disagreement between the contractor and Benwood, West Virginia, officials over an escrow account being created to ensure demolition is completed once started. A Federal Court has ordered that the escrow account be in place by June 20, 2013, and the bridge be demolished within 8 months of the formation of the escrow account. The contractor faces a $1,000 per day fine for not meeting these conditions.

Three companies have placed liens against the bridge claiming scrap rights, with at least two of those companies claiming they paid for exclusive scrapping rights. The next trial date is set for November 12, 2013. As of 2021, the bridge remains standing and the dispute is ongoing.

== See also ==
- List of crossings of the Ohio River

== Sources ==
- Martins Ferry Daily Times (Martins Ferry, Ohio). December 22, 1926.
- Martins Ferry Daily Times (Martins Ferry, Ohio). July 1, 1927.
- The Intelligencer (Wheeling, West Virginia). December 1, 1990.
- The Intelligencer (Wheeling, West Virginia). March 27, 1991.
- The Wheeling News Register - Ohio Edition (Wheeling, West Virginia). April 22, 1991.
- Letter from the Interstate Bridge Company (Bellaire, Ohio). March 27, 1948.
