= Marshy Point Nature Center =

Nature center in Middle River, Maryland, US

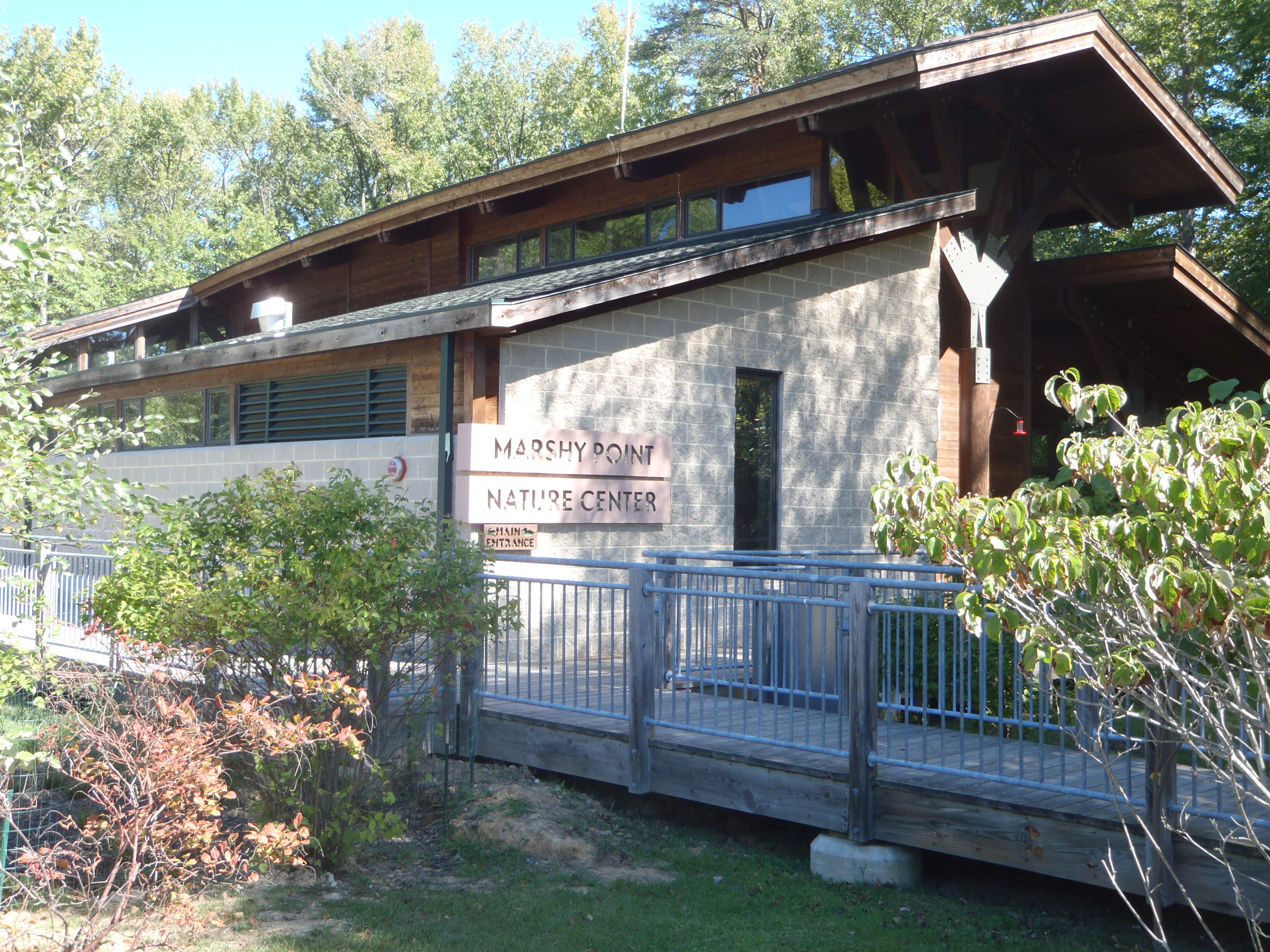
- Interactive map of Marshy Point Nature Center
- Type: nature center
- Location: 7130 Marshy Point Road; Middle River, Maryland
- Coordinates: 39°21′02″N 76°22′44″W
- Area: 500 acres (2.0 km^{2})
- Created: May 1, 2000
- Operator: Baltimore County, Maryland
- Website: www.marshypoint.org

Marshy Point Nature Center is a nature center in Middle River, Maryland operated by the Baltimore County Department of Recreation and Parks and the nonprofit Marshy Point Nature Center Council. The center, built along the Dundee and Saltpeter Creeks, opened in 2000.

The nature center is open from 9 am to 5 pm and publishes a quarterly calendar of public programs. Marshy Point Park contains 8 miles of trails, a boat dock, and a canoe launch.

Exhibits in the nature center and surrounding park provide close encounters with native wildlife and describe the importance of the Chesapeake Bay and its surrounding habitats.

== History ==
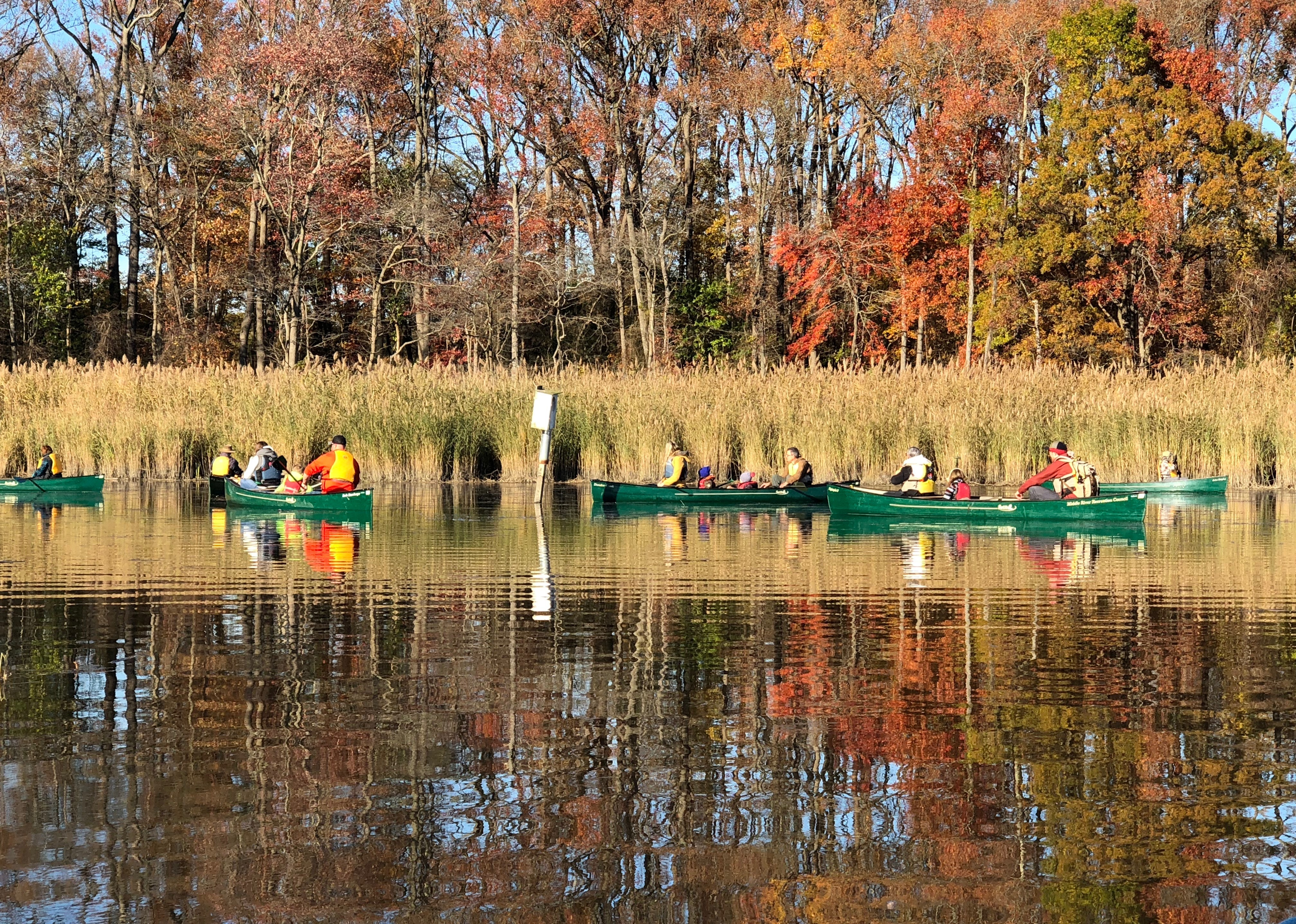
Canoeing on Dundee Creek at Marshy Point

Groundbreaking began on the center on October 20, 1998, enabled by a $2.7 million grant. In 2000, the state of Maryland spent $2 million to purchase the trails behind the center.

The center officially opened to the public on May 1, 2000.

In 2005, $300,000 was approved for the expansion of the center. This expansion provided 30% more space at the facility.
