= Kresson, Baltimore =

Coordinates: 39°17′45″N 76°33′29″W

Kresson
- Neighborhood of Baltimore
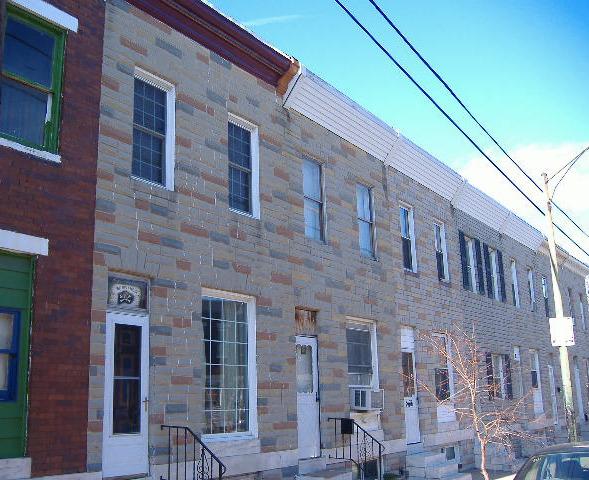
- Rowhouses on South Kresson Street

- Location within Baltimore
- Country: United States
- State: Maryland
- City: Baltimore
- Time zone: UTC-5 (Eastern)
  - Summer (DST): EDT
- ZIP code: 21224
- Area code: 410, 443, and 667

Kresson is a neighborhood of Southeast Baltimore, Maryland, United States.

The area currently known as Kresson is primarily an industrial district, though a small section contains a residential neighborhood. Residents of Kresson often refer to their neighborhood as Highlandtown, a larger, adjacent residential neighborhood. Kresson's boundaries are defined by Pulaski Highway (U.S. Route 40) to the north, East Lombard and East Pratt Streets to the south, Haven Street (north and south portions) to the west and rail tracks to the east.

The residential neighborhood in Kresson is architecturally, like much of Baltimore, composed of rowhouses. These row houses were constructed around the year 1900. The 2000 census determined its residents to be racially diverse, though predominantly lower-income. The neighborhood of 395 people was 75.9% white, and 20.3% African American.

Kresson Street, which runs through the heart of the Kresson neighborhood, from East Lombard Street to East Monument Street (0.1 miles outside Kresson) is a section of MD 150.

The north-south streets are arranged in consecutive order alphabetically, so to the west of Kresson lie Baylis, Conkling, Dean, Eaton, Fagley, Grundy, Haven, Iris and Janney, while those to the east are named Lehigh, Macon, Newkirk, Oldham, Ponca, Quail, Rappolla, Savage, Tolna and Umbra.
