= Hanover Street Bridge =

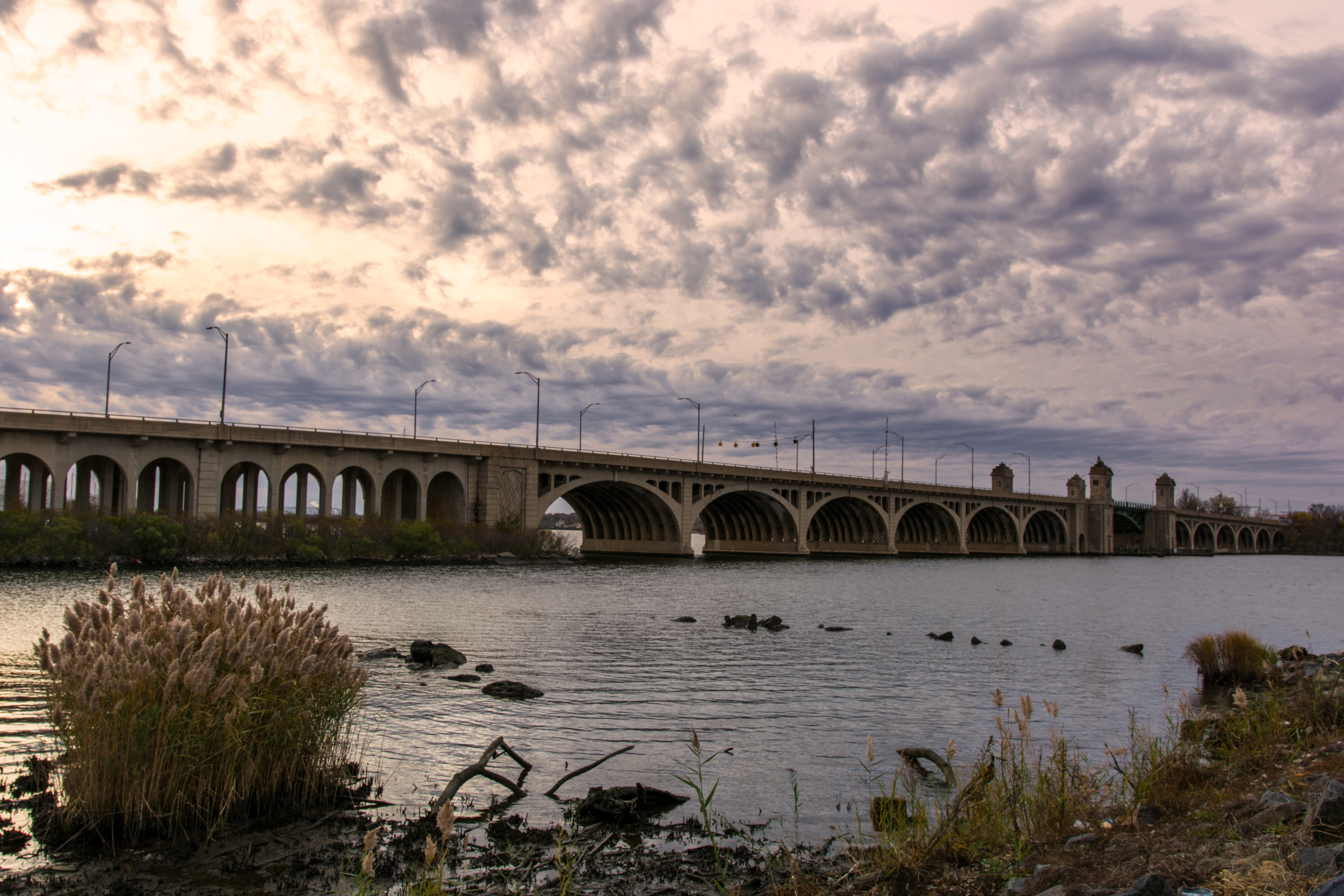
- View of the bridge facing northwest, from West Covington Park
- Coordinates: 39°15′28.0″N 76°36′58.6″W
- Carries: five lanes (2 north, 2 south, 1 reversible) of MD 2, pedestrians
- Crosses: Patapsco River
- Locale: Baltimore, Maryland
- Official name: Vietnam Veterans Memorial Bridge
- ID number: #BC5210

Characteristics
- Design: Beaux-Arts-style reinforced double leaf bascule bridge
- Total length: 2,290 feet (698 m)

History
- Designer: J. E. Greiner Company
- Opened: 1916

Location
- Interactive map of Hanover Street Bridge

The Hanover Street Bridge, officially the Vietnam Veterans Memorial Bridge, is a double leaf bascule bridge crossing the middle branch of the Patapsco River along Hanover Street (Maryland Route 2) in Baltimore, Maryland.

== Description ==
The Hanover Street Bridge is a 2,290 feet (698 m)-long Beaux-Arts-style double leaf bascule bridge spanning the middle branch of the Patapsco River in the outer harbor of Baltimore, linking the downtown and the community of Westport. It has 38 spans.

== History ==
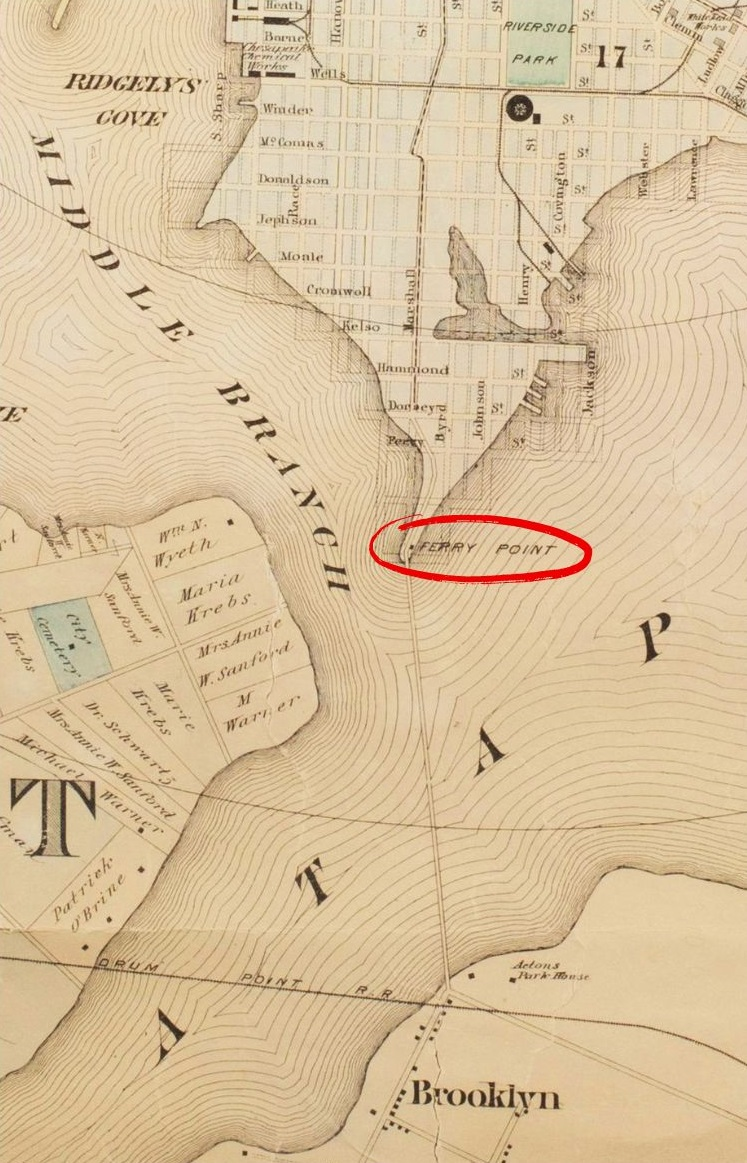
1882 map of the Light Street Bridge, which the Hanover Street Bridge replaced.

The Hanover Street Bridge replaced the Light Street Bridge, a wooden "long bridge" built in 1858, which had burnt down in 1914. Around the time of the construction of the bridge, trucks had begun to overtake steamboats as the preferred means of transferring goods. It was designed by the J. E. Greiner Company on the behalf of the Maryland State Roads Commission, becoming the longest reinforced concrete bridge in Maryland at its opening in 1916.

The bridge's construction spurred residential and industrial growth in the area, causing the waterfront on the middle branch Patapsco River to be zoned for heavy industry and manufacturing. This made the waterway accumulate silt, causing it to be less viable for shipping, and erasing the previous recreational area around the river.

Around late 1992, a group of Vietnam veterans, led by Ed Vogel, had begun to petition the Baltimore City Council to dedicate the bridge, which was near the Maryland Vietnam Veterans Memorial, to the veterans of the Vietnam War. A bill to rename the bridge passed the council, being signed into law by Mayor of Baltimore Kurt Schmoke. On May 30, 1993, a day before Memorial Day, the bridge was dedicated as the Vietnam Veterans Memorial Bridge, in a ceremony attended by over 600 people. Schmoke and president of the City Council Mary Pat Clarke spoke at the ceremony, in which memorial plaques funded by local veteran groups were placed on the bridge. At the same time, three Huey helicopters flew overhead and a fireboat shot water into the air. Around the late 1990s, a makeshift tent city of homeless people had developed under the bridge.

After the Francis Scott Key Bridge collapse on March 26, 2024, the Hanover Street Bridge became a secondary alternate route for drivers, and a primary alternate route for trucks containing hazardous loads, which are not permitted to use the Baltimore Harbor Tunnel or the Fort McHenry Tunnel.
