= R.E. Burger Power Station =

Former coal power plant in Ohio

- Country: United States
- Location: Mead Township, Belmont County, near Shadyside, Ohio
- Coordinates: 39°54′34″N 80°45′37″W
- Status: Decommissioned
- Commission date: Unit 1: 1944; Unit 2: 1947; Unit 3: 1950; Units 4–5: 1955
- Decommission date: Units 1–2: 1995; Units 4–5: 2010; Unit 3: 2011
- Owner: FirstEnergy
- Operator: FirstEnergy

Thermal power station
- Primary fuel: Coal
- Cooling source: Ohio River

Power generation
- Nameplate capacity: 568 MW

R.E. Burger Power Station was a 568 megawatt (MW), coal power plant located south of Shadyside, Ohio, in Belmont County, Ohio. The plant closed in 2011. It was operated by FirstEnergy.

== History ==
R.E. Burger was constructed in the 1940s to meet industrial demand for power generation during World War II. Unit 1 went into operation in 1944 and Unit 2 came online in 1947 at a cost of $5 million. Both units had a capacity of 65 MW. Unit 3, which went into operation in 1950 after two years of construction, had a generating capacity of 100 MW. The unit cost $12 million to construct and was financed from the issuing of Ohio Edison stock by Lehman Brothers. Units 4 and 5 started generating electricity in 1955 and each had a generating capacity of 135 MW. The cost to construct both units totaled $43.2 million. The plant is named after R.E. Burger, a former chairman of Ohio Public Service Company and later Ohio Edison.

== Environmental mitigation and testing ==
In 1991, R.E. Burger was an experimental site for clean coal technology by Ohio Edison with sponsorship from the United States Department of Energy. A SO_{x}-NO_{x} Rox Box (SNRB) developed by Babcock & Wilcox simultaneously removed sulfur dioxide (SO_{2}), nitrogen oxide (NO_{x}), and particulates at the same time in a 5 MW unit. Sorbent Technologies developed and demonstrated a jet-engine filter for pollution control at R.E. Burger in 1994. In that same year, R.E. Burger incinerated refuse-derived fuel in Unit 2 as a test run to see if fuel costs and emissions could be reduced. FirstEnergy assumed ownership of R.E. Burger in 1997 following a merger between Ohio Edison and Centerior Energy. In 2004, an Electro-Catalytic Oxidation (ECO) scrubber, designed by Powerspan to reduce SO_{2} and mercury emissions, was tested at R.E. Burger with a generating capacity of 50 MW. FirstEnergy announced in 2007 to install ECO scrubbers to Units 4 and 5 with a planned start-up scheduled for 2011. Between 2006 and 2010, R.E. Burger was a test site for the Midwest Regional Carbon Sequestration Partnership's (MRCSP) carbon sequestration project. The project tested the potential of capturing carbon dioxide (CO_{2}) emissions and injecting it into geologic rock acting as a storage well.

== Retirement, demolition, and future plans ==
Ohio Edison shut down Units 1 and 2 in 1995 as the enforcement of the Clean Air Act's 1990 amendments meant that both units were in non-compliance and the cost to retrofit outweighed the benefits. FirstEnergy had plans in 2009 to convert R.E. Burger into a biomass plant to remain profitable in the face of cheaper natural gas prices and lower demand for electricity during the Great Recession. The costs to convert into a biomass plant was $130 million cheaper compared to installing industrial scrubbers to reduce pollution. Unfortunately, the economics to continue running R.E. Burger remained futile and FirstEnergy closed two units at the end of 2010. The final unit, Unit 3, retired in 2011 due to stricter environmental rules.

Demolition of R.E. Burger began in 2015 after four years of decommissioning. Demolition was completed in July 2016 when the plant's 854 feet (260.3 m) smokestack was imploded using explosive charges. Thailand-based chemical company PTT Global Chemical bought 168 acres of the former remediated R.E. Burger site from FirstEnergy for $13.8 million in 2017 to construct an ethane cracker plant.

== See also ==
- List of power stations in Ohio
