= Masonville, Baltimore =

Masonville
- Former Neighborhood of Baltimore
- Location within Baltimore
- Coordinates: 39°14′28.698″N 76°35′38.6088″W
- Country: United States
- State: Maryland
- City: Baltimore
- Founded: 1890s (annexed into Baltimore City, 1918-1919)
- Demolished: 1953-1957
- Time zone: UTC-5 (Eastern)
  - Summer (DST): EDT
- ZIP code: 21225
- Area code: 410, 443, and 667

Masonville was a residential community and suburban neighborhood of Baltimore, Maryland. Historically, the town was one of five neighboring communities (along with Brooklyn, Curtis Bay, Fairfield, and Wagner's Point) sought and ultimately annexed by Baltimore City from Anne Arundel County in 1918. The town was razed in its entirety in the 1950s, to accommodate the expansion of the Baltimore & Ohio Railroad's Curtis Bay terminal.

The site of the former community is now primarily occupied by the Harbor Tunnel Thruway (part of Interstate 895).

== Etymology ==
According to one source, the name Masonville is attributed to an early resident named Mason, who established a workshop producing crackers and bread there.

== History ==
=== Foundation to Annexation ===
The town that would be Masonville was founded in the 1890s, centered on what was then Ninth Street & Chesapeake Avenue, directly adjacent to the newly expanded lines of the Baltimore & Ohio Railroad's (B&O) Curtis Bay Branch. Along with other communities bordering the Patapsco River, Anne Arundel County extended electric light to the town in 1902. A new Methodist Episcopal Church was dedicated in 1903 at $3000 (equivalent to $107,500 in 2025). A small fundamentalist church and related school were also established at this time.

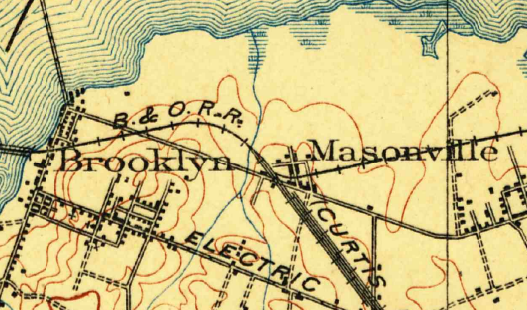
Masonville & neighboring Brooklyn in 1907

Despite its small size, Masonville boasted its saloon, and, along with its neighboring settlements, was one of the few "wet" areas in Anne Arundel County as prohibition was gathering strength. From at least 1910, Masonville also supported an amateur sports team, the Masonville Country Club (also known as Masonville Athletic Club), which competed in intra-city baseball and basketball.

Around 1915, Masonville benefited as a hub from the increased rail traffic toward Curtis Bay and Fairfield, where the oil industry in both places was experiencing boom growth. The Masonville B&O yard became a large storage site for the hundreds of tanker cars needed to supply this industry. 25 acres near the town were used to store cars for wheat as well, and demand on the railroad branch (the sole line that serviced the peninsula) was to only increase with the commencement of construction of the B&O's enormous coal pier in Curtis Bay in 1916. So rapid was the railroad's expansion that it had to house 75 of its workers at Masonville in converted railcars rather than homes. By 1917, the B&O's yard at Masonville had grown to nearly 50 acres.

Plans for a proper sewer system, which had not previously existed outside of neighboring Brooklyn, were finally initiated by the county in 1916. Citizens of Masonville, along with their neighbors, complained of what they perceived as the lawlessness coming from the many saloons directly adjacent to - but not under the jurisdiction or regulation of - Baltimore City itself. These citizens formed a Home Defenders League to demand action be taken against these taverns and resorts, which catered to Baltimore residents. Arguing World War I made it a national security issue, the Home Defenders League advocated the creation of areas of alcohol prohibition around the growing industrial areas on the peninsula.

Masonville's proximity to the growing Baltimore City invited consideration of its annexation nearly from its founding. The Brooklyn Improvement Association had proposed a bill to annex Brooklyn & Masonville to Baltimore City as early as 1910. Among the two communities, 81% of respondents supported being annexed, with supporters complaining of the currently inadequate water supply, fire services, and road maintenance provided by the county. A 1914 fire for instance destroyed seven Masonville homes, and endangered the entire neighborhood, due to a lack of water for fire fighting, followed by another uncontrolled fire that destroyed a further four homes two months later. Residents also complained that the county's contractor for sanitation failed to collect the town's garbage even weekly, let alone biweekly as the contract had required. Masonville was included in Baltimore City's initial 1916 proposed annexation map, and was included within the portion of Anne Arundel County ultimately annexed by the legislation passed in March 1918.

=== Demolition and Redevelopment ===
In the early 1950s, the same railroad that had been the cause of its creation also became the cause of its destruction, as the town was razed to accommodate the expansion of the B&O's Curtis Bay terminal. The railroad sought to avoid antiquated and dangerous underpasses and at-grade crossings, and the required land required the purchasing of the land under the town by B&O, who in turn deeded it to Baltimore city for demolition and redevelopment. The last buildings were destroyed to make way for the Harbor Tunnel Thruway in 1957.

The remaining land north of the railroad yards remained in the hands of the Arundel Corporation for many years, which operated a dump at the site. Beginning in 1976, the State of Maryland pursued plans for an ambitious 250-acre redevelopment of the waterfront at Masonville as a new marine terminal, and two years later, the Maryland Port Authority purchased the requisite land from the Arundel Corporation Within the year, the land was being partly used for storage of excess automobile freight. When development of the new container terminal failed to materialize over the next decade, the port authority began plans to semi-permanently lease a third of the territory to auto importers.

=== Environmental Education Center ===
Beginning in 1998, local residents and environmental groups began to argue for the protection of what had become an "accidental wildlife refuge" by turning Masonville Cove into a nature park. The State of Maryland committed in 2007 to a $130 million clean up of 100 acres of the Masonville site, which included the removal of thousands of tons of debris and 27 abandoned vessels. The redevelopment of Masonville Cove was to include a park with hiking trails, a nature center and an artificial oyster reef.

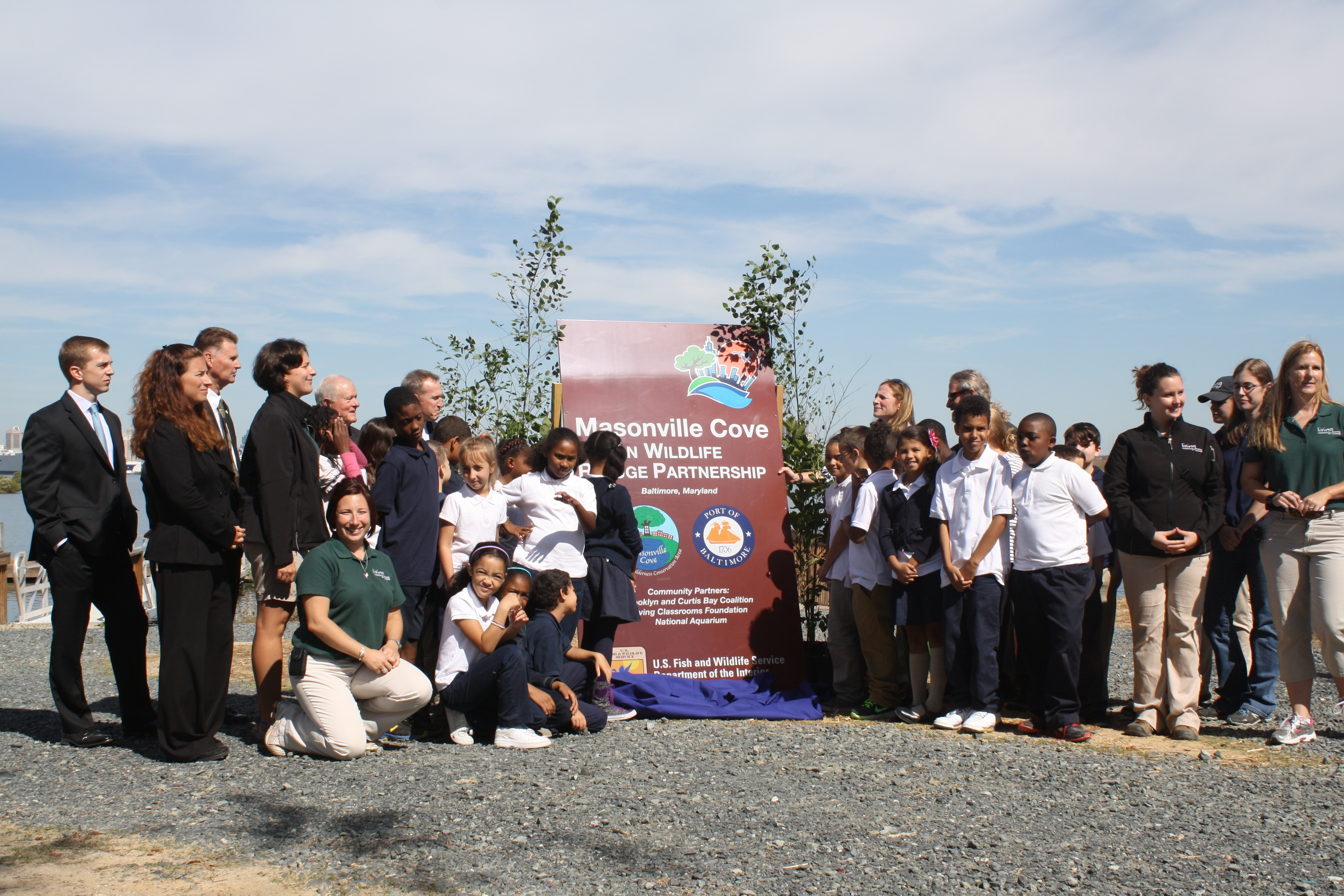
Students from Curtis Bay Elementary School unveil the Masonville Cove Urban Wildlife Refuge Partnership sign along with partners.

In 2008, the state broke ground on the Masonville Cove Environmental Education Center. Designed and built by Baltimore Green Construction, the Center is a "Near-Zero Net Energy Building", designed to consume 75% less energy than a standard commercial building of its size. The Center was opened by Lt. Governor Anthony Brown on Earth Day of 2009, and is now open for educational programs.

== Demographics ==
According to an 1893 account, Masonville consisted of 51 homes, with a population of 218 (66 men, 51 boys, 56 women, 45 girls), all of whom were recorded as white. By 1910, the population had grown to 400 people, living in about 100 houses.

== Works cited ==
- The Brooklyn-Curtis Bay Historical Committee (1976). A History of Brooklyn-Curtis Bay (1st ed.). Baltimore: J.C. O'Donovan & Co.
- Diamond, Philip (1998). An Environmental History of Fairfield/Wagner Point. Baltimore: University of Maryland School of Law.
