= Interstate 470 Bridge =

Bridge in United States of America

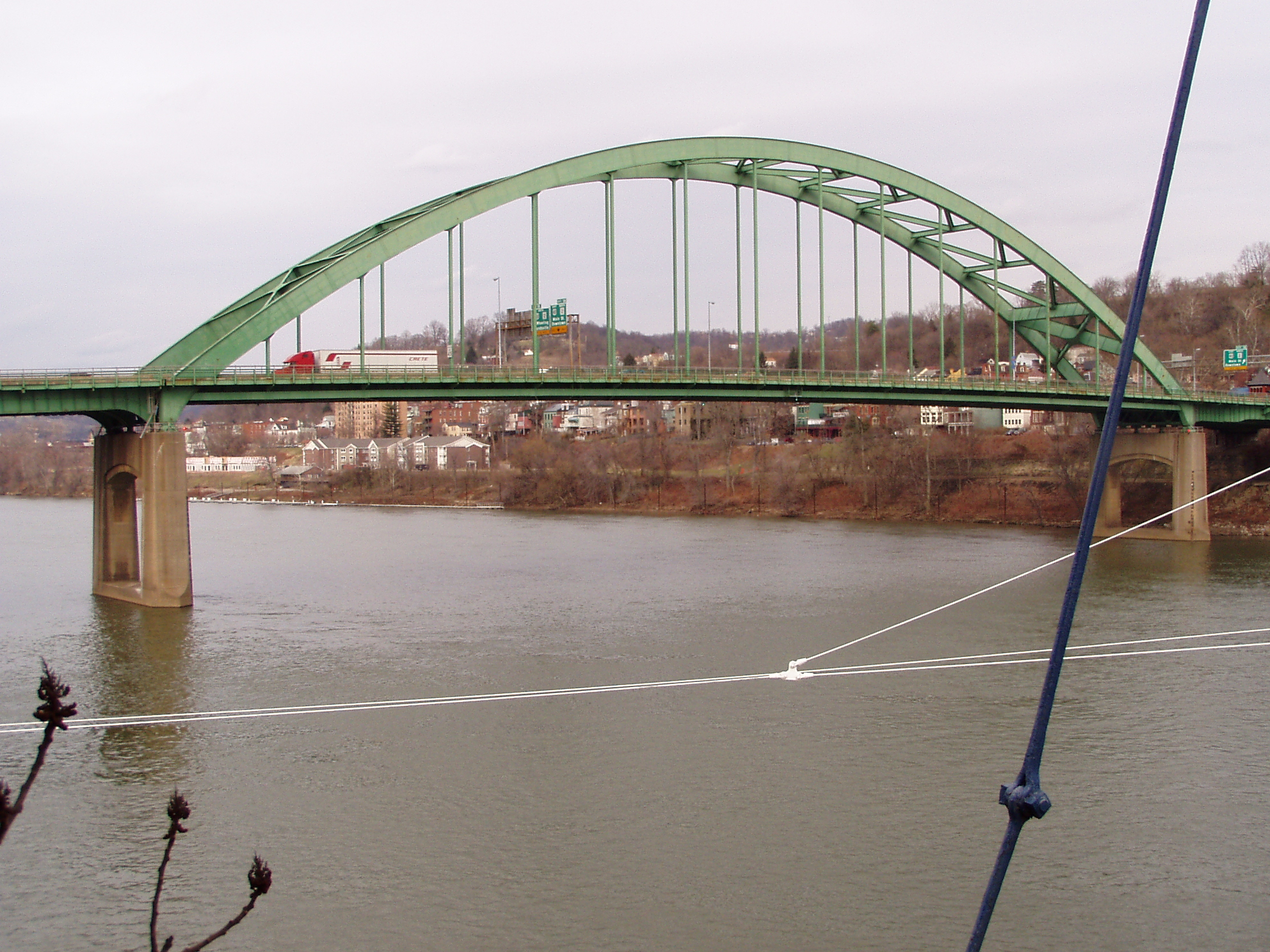
- The Vietnam Veterans Memorial Bridge is a four-lane tied arch bridge in the United States. It carries Interstate 470 over the Ohio River between Bellaire, Ohio and Wheeling, West Virginia.
- Coordinates: 40.0498°N 80.7307°W
- Carries: 4 lanes of I-470
- Crosses: Ohio River
- Locale: Bellaire, Ohio and Wheeling, West Virginia
- Official name: Vietnam Veterans Memorial Bridge
- Maintained by: West Virginia Department of Transportation
- ID number: 00000000035A123

Characteristics
- Design: Tied-arch bridge
- Total length: 1,342 ft (409 m)
- Longest span: 784 ft (239 m)
- Clearance above: 69 ft (21 m)

History
- Construction start: 1975
- Construction end: 1983

Location
- Interactive map of Interstate 470 Bridge

The Vietnam Veterans Memorial Bridge is a four-lane tied arch bridge in the United States. It carries Interstate 470 over the Ohio River between Bellaire, Ohio and Wheeling, West Virginia.

== History ==
Construction on the tied-arch bridge began in 1975, and was scheduled to be completed by 1981. Frays in the vertical hanger cables delayed the opening of the bridge, which was scheduled to open in July 1981. Additionally, delays in completing Ohio State Route 7 along the western shores of the river and Interstate 470 also resulted in the bridge not fully opening.

The estimated cost to construct the span was about $54 million.

The opening of the Vietnam Veterans Memorial Bridge, along with another bridge in nearby Moundsville was thought to have reduced the amount of traffic, and thus tolls collected by the nearby Bellaire Bridge by up to 50 percent in 1987.

== See also ==
- List of crossings of the Ohio River
- Fort Henry Bridge, another tied arch bridge across the Ohio River at Wheeling
