= Allan Hornyak =

American basketball player (1951–2025)

Personal information
- Born: March 3, 1951 Bellaire, Ohio, U.S.
- Died: August 25, 2025 (aged 74)
- Listed height: 6 ft 1 in (1.85 m)
- Listed weight: 185 lb (84 kg)

Career information
- High school: St. John Central (Bellaire, Ohio)
- College: Ohio State (1970–1973)
- NBA draft: 1973: 2nd round, 26th overall pick
- Drafted by: Cleveland Cavaliers
- Position: Shooting guard

Career highlights
- Second-team All-American – UPI (1972); 2× Third-team All-American – NABC (1972, 1973); Third-team All-American – UPI (1973); 3× First-team All-Big Ten (1971–1973); Second-team Parade All-American (1969)
- Stats at Basketball Reference

Allan J. Hornyak (March 3, 1951 – August 25, 2025) was an American basketball player known for his high school and collegiate careers. Despite being selected in the 1973 NBA draft by the Cleveland Cavaliers and also in the 1973 ABA Draft by the Indiana Pacers, Hornyak never played professional basketball.

== Playing career ==
=== High school ===
Hornyak was born on March 3, 1951. He played at St. John Central High School in Bellaire, Ohio. He played the shooting guard position and set many scoring records while he attended. In his final two seasons (1967–68 and 1968–69), Hornyak led both the Ohio Valley Athletic Conference (OVAC) and the state of Ohio in scoring. His junior season saw him average 42.7 points per game en route to 812 total points, while his senior season saw him average 41.9 per game with a total of 923 points. His 86-point single game performance against Tiltonsville High School in 1969 set the all-time OVAC record (he followed that game with a 61-point performance against archrival Bellaire High School). He finished his prep career with a then-conference record 2,385 points. During his senior year he gained national attention for his incredible scoring outbursts.

=== College ===
Ohio State University was the school who landed Hornyak even though he was highly recruited. He had to sit out his freshman season in 1969–70 due to NCAA rules at the time which prohibited freshmen athletes from playing on varsity teams. In his final three college seasons Hornyak led the Buckeyes in scoring and was named to the All-Big Ten Conference Team each year. He was an honorable mention All-American in his final two seasons. In just 69 career games Hornyak scored 1,572 points and averaged over 20 points per game. He was later inducted into the Ohio State Sports Hall of Fame. Columbus Channel 4 sportscaster Jimmy Crum who was the play-by-play announcer for Ohio State men’s basketball games dubbed Allan Hornyak “The Bellaire Bomber.”

=== Professional ===
Following his successful career at Ohio State, Hornyak was chosen by the Cleveland Cavaliers in the second round (26th overall) of the 1973 NBA draft. That same spring, the Indiana Pacers of the American Basketball Association chose him in the supplemental ABA Draft. Despite being drafted by two different teams, Hornyak never played professional basketball.

== Death ==
Hornyak died on August 25, 2025, at the age of 74.
