= John Niemiec =

American football player and coach (1901–1976)

Biographical details
- Born: March 21, 1901; Bellaire, Ohio, U.S.
- Died: June 16, 1976 (aged 75)

Playing career
- 1926–1928: Notre Dame
- Position: Halfback

Coaching career (HC unless noted)
- 1934–1937: Columbia (IA)

Head coaching record
- Overall: 11–17–2 (college)

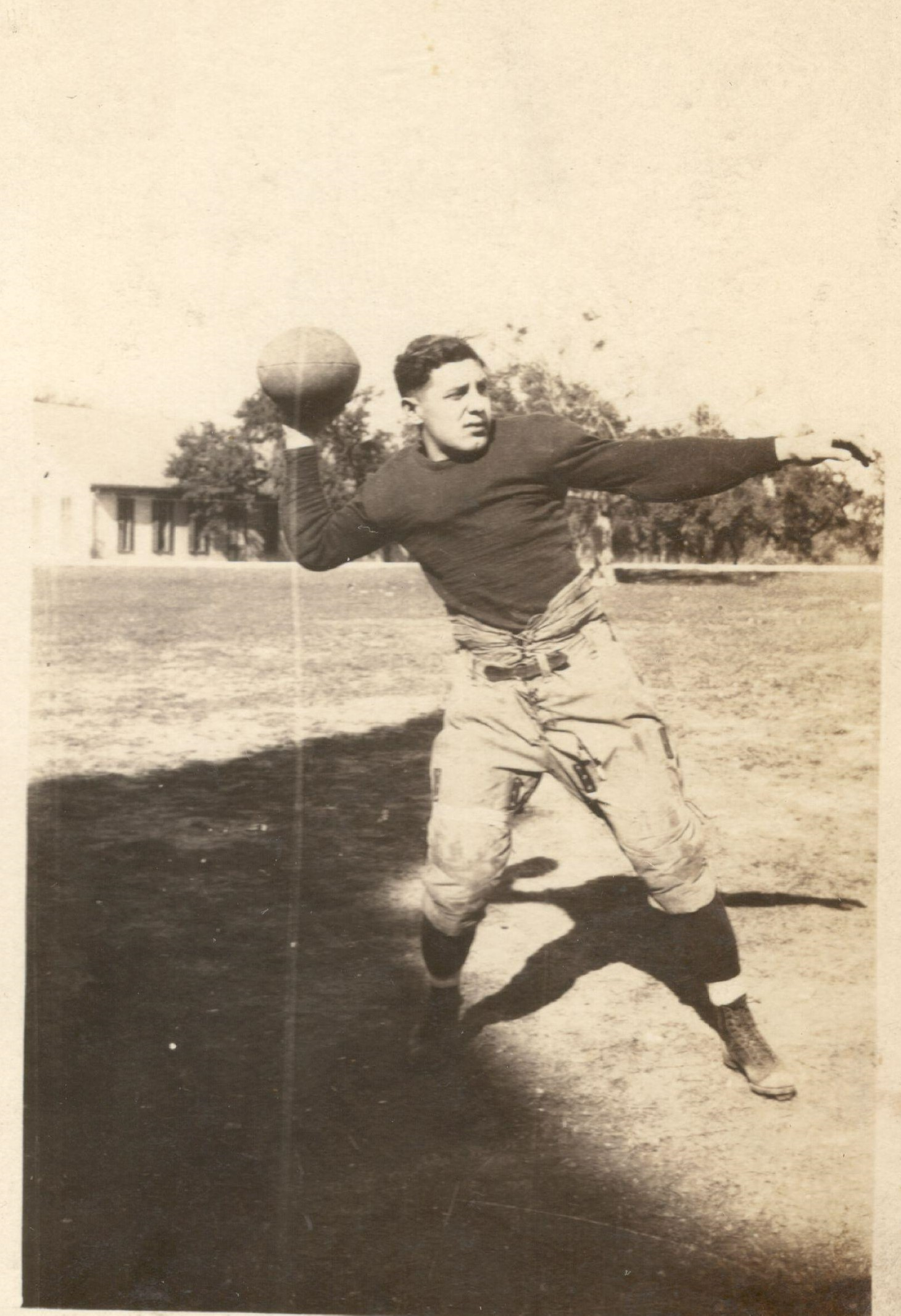
John Niemiec at Notre Dame- from Bellaire High School Archives

John Niemiec (March 21, 1901 – June 16, 1976) was an American football player and coach. He served as the head football coach at Columbia College—now known as Loras College—in Dubuque, Iowa from 1934 to 1937. Niemiec played college football at the University of Notre Dame from 1926 to 1928. In the first-ever meeting with USC, Niemiec caught a game-winning touchdown pass from 23-yards out with under 2 minutes left. He also threw the famous touchdown pass to Johnny O'Brien in the "Win One for the Gipper" game over top-ranked Army at Yankee Stadium. He led the Fighting Irish in passing in 1927 and 1928. Niemiec also coached at Steubenville High School in Steubenville, Ohio and Bellaire High School in his home town of Bellaire, Ohio. In 1940, Niemiec's Big Reds defeated Woody Hayes' New Philadelphia Quakers 54-7 in Hayes's largest loss of his coaching career. He died on June 16, 1976, at the age of 75. He is a member of the Bellaire High School Hall of Fame.

== Head coaching record ==
=== College ===
Year	Team	Overall	Conference	Standing	Bowl/playoffs
Columbia Duhawks (Iowa Conference) (1934–1937)
1934	Columbia	1–4–1	1–3–1	11th	
1935	Columbia	3–4	2–3	7th	
1934	Columbia	3–4	1–4	9th	
1937	Columbia	4–5–1	2–3–1	8th	
Columbia:		11–17–2	6–13–2		
Total:		11–17–2			
