= The Wagons Roll at Night =

1941 film by Ray Enright

- 1941 movie poster
- Directed by: Ray Enright
- Written by: Fred Niblo Jr. Barry Trivers
- Based on: Kid Galahad by Francis Wallace
- Produced by: Harlan Thompson
- Starring: Humphrey Bogart; Sylvia Sidney; Eddie Albert
- Cinematography: Sid Hickox
- Edited by: Mark Richards
- Music by: Heinz Roemheld
- Production company: Warner Bros. Pictures
- Distributed by: Warner Bros. Pictures
- Release date: April 26, 1941
- Running time: 84 minutes
- Country: United States
- Language: English

The Wagons Roll at Night is a 1941 American circus drama film directed by Ray Enright and starring Humphrey Bogart as traveling carnival owner Nick Coster, Sylvia Sidney as his girlfriend, and Eddie Albert as a newcomer who falls in love with Nick's sister, played by Joan Leslie. The screenplay is by Fred Niblo Jr. and Barry Trivers, and the film is based on the 1936 novel Kid Galahad by Francis Wallace, first published as a serial in The Saturday Evening Post.

This film marks the only instance to date when the story was presented using its original circus setting, as Wallace's novel was the basis for the earlier 1937 film Kid Galahad, directed by Michael Curtiz—also for Warner Bros. Pictures and featuring Bogart in a supporting role—but using the boxing world as a backdrop. In 1962, United Artists produced a musical remake of the "boxing" version of Wallace's story under the same title, directed by Phil Karlson and starring Elvis Presley as the boxer.

== Plot ==
An aggressive lion named Caesar escapes from a traveling circus owned and managed by Nick Coster, but is cornered in a grocery store by clerk Matt Varney. Seeing that Matt has become an instant celebrity with the town's residents, Nick hires the farm boy to work with his current lion tamer, Hoffman the Great. Nick finds Hoffman drunk and passed out before he is to perform, so Nick convinces Matt to take Hoffman's place. When Matt does well, Nick fires Hoffman (and keeps his lions, as he owes Nick a lot of money).

At a bar in the city, Matt tries to apologize to Hoffman for taking over his job. Hoffman follows Matt back to the circus and goads him into a fight. Hoffman is badly injured by Caesar after he is pushed up next to the lion's cage. Nick's girlfriend, Flo Lorraine, a fortune teller at the circus, drives Matt to Nick's farm to hide him from the police, despite knowing that Nick is adamant about keeping circus people away from his family because he feels the former are beneath the latter. Unknown to Flo, Nick's younger sister Mary has graduated and has come home. While Matt is recovering from his injuries, he and Flo fall in love. When Nick returns from a business trip, Flo tells him about Matt. Nick goes to the farm and orders Matt to leave with him and to never see Mary again. Matt reluctantly agrees.

During a break between shows, Matt becomes increasingly worried that he cannot contact Mary because of his promise to Nick. Flo believes that Matt is in love with her, but she becomes heartbroken when Matt tells her that he is in love with Mary. Flo then persuades Matt to ignore Nick's order. Once Nick returns from another trip, he learns that Matt is back at the farm. He arrives there, and, during an argument, he slaps Mary for being disrespectful. Matt then slugs him.

After their fight, Nick plans to have Matt killed in the lion cage. He convinces Matt to perform with Caesar in order to build his reputation as a lion tamer. He then gives Matt an unloaded lion tamer's gun. As Matt is in the cage, Flo and Mary arrive at the circus. Matt uses his skills against Caesar, but is fighting a losing battle, as the unloaded gun has no effect in scaring the lion. Nick is persuaded by Mary to go into the cage to rescue Matt. He distracts the lion away from Matt, but is subsequently attacked and killed by the lion.

== Cast ==
- Humphrey Bogart as Nick Coster
- Sylvia Sidney as Flo Lorraine
- Eddie Albert as Matt Varney
- Joan Leslie as Mary Coster
- Sig Ruman as Hoffman the Great
- Cliff Clark as Doc
- Charley Foy as Snapper
- Frank Wilcox as Tex
- John Ridgely as Arch
- Clara Blandick as Mrs. Williams
- Aldrich Bowker as Mr. Williams
- Jack Mower as Bundy
- Frank Mayo as Wally
- Garry Owen as Gus
- Grace Hayle as Mrs. Grebnick
- Dick Elliott as Mr. Paddleford
- Eddie Acuff as Pickpocket victim
- Stuart Holmes as Rural Taxi Driver
- John Dilson as Minister
- Fay Helm as Wife

== Reception ==
Bosley Crowther, critic for The New York Times, liked Eddie Albert's performance, but not "the definitely unoriginal plot". He also felt that Bogart and Sidney were miscast.

== Bibliography ==
- Barbour, Alan G. Humphrey Bogart. W. H. Allen, 1974.
- Fetrow, Alan G. Feature Films, 1940-1949: a United States Filmography. McFarland, 1994.
- Goble, Alan. The Complete Index to Literary Sources in Film. Walter de Gruyter, 1999.
