= Subway Alumni =

Group of University of Notre Dame fans

The Subway Alumni are a group of Notre Dame Fighting Irish fans who are known for their strict allegiance to the school although never attending or graduating from the school. The group's nickname originated when New York City area residents began traveling to early Notre Dame football games around the New York area by train. The largely Irish and Catholic population began to rally around the emerging Midwestern school.

In 1991, Notre Dame on NBC continued to increase and grow the size of the Subway Alumni when every Notre Dame football home game was televised nationally.

For the last nine decades, the Subway Alumni has grown through generation after generation. Although born in the New York City area, the group quickly spread to Scranton, Philadelphia, Boston, Chicago and the rest of the country.

In Italy, where a Notre Dame Club was founded in 1944, 'subway alumni' are known as 'catacomb alumni'.

== History ==
In 1913, led by Coach Jesse Harper, Notre Dame football set out to expand past their mid-western roots and scheduled games with national powerhouses Texas, Penn State and Army. On November 1, 1913, led by quarterback Charles "Gus" Dorais and end Knute Rockne Notre Dame stunned the Black Knights on the Hudson, by a final score of 35–13 at West Point.

In 1918, Knute Rockne was named Head Coach of Notre Dame, then known as the Ramblers. During his 13 seasons, Rockne would become a legendary figure in Notre Dame history, winning three National Championships and finishing with an overall 105-12-5 record.

By the 1919 game at West Point, there was a crowd of more than 5,000, which included hundreds – 700, according to the Notre Dame Scholastic, the weekly student publication – of Notre Dame supporters, many of them former players, alumni, and current students, including spectators from the New York area who would ultimately become the core of what would be called Notre Dame's "Subway Alumni" and whose ranks would eventually spread throughout the country.

In the 1920s, Notre Dame alumnus Francis Wallace popularized the often used nickname of "Fighting Irish" when referring to the team in his New York Daily News columns. In 1927, University President Rev. Matthew Walsh, C.S.C., officially adopted "Fighting Irish" as the Notre Dame nickname. The victory over Army not only focused more attention on Notre Dame but boosted the spirits of tens of thousands of Irish Catholics throughout the country – many of whom had never set foot on a college campus but had become enamored of a team and a university with which they now had a common bond. These newfound followers of Notre Dame football would come to be known as the school's "Subway Alumni."

Perhaps the most notable aspect of the 1921 season was Notre Dame playing three games within the span of eight days. After beating Army on Saturday, November 5, the team remained in the New York area, staying and practicing at the Bear Mountain Inn near West Point, and then made its New York City debut the following Tuesday, Election Day, by routing Rutgers, 48–0, before a crowd of less than 12,000 at the Polo Grounds, home of baseball's New York Giants and New York Yankees. Despite the short period of time between the games, Rockne had accepted an offer from Rutgers – who Notre Dame had never played – to play at the Polo Grounds because it would attract the attention of New York's dozen newspapers and Notre Dame alumni in the metropolitan area, along with hopefully adding to its growing "Subway Alumni" who had no connection with the school.

In 1923, having outgrown Cullum Field at West Point, Notre Dame and Army decided to move their rivalry to New York. The first game was played before a near-capacity crowd of around 35,000 at Ebbets Field in Brooklyn, then home to the Brooklyn Robins of the National League, later known as the Dodgers. The second game, played in Manhattan on October 18, 1924, at the Polo Grounds, home of the New York Giants baseball team, attracted a larger crowd, a capacity gathering of 55,000. An even bigger crowd of about 65,000 turned out for the third New York City game, and the first at Yankee Stadium in the Bronx. Those large crowds, which mainly seemed to be made up of Notre Dame supporters – perhaps because of the city's large Irish population – were an indication that the school's "Subway Alumni" was continuing to grow.

In the early days of Notre Dame football becoming a national powerhouse, the Subway Alumni received its name because so many of them were from New York City and traveled by subway to and from Army-Notre Dame games throughout the New York City area. In years to come, the Subway Alumni would expand throughout Philadelphia, Chicago, Boston and cities all over the country and abroad.

== Alumni Associations ==
The University of Notre Dame Alumni Association has clubs in other cities elsewhere in the world. However, these clubs are not exclusive to only those who have graduated from the university. The Subway Alumni make up a portion of the membership in many of these clubs. The Gettysburg, Pennsylvania club is made up of ninety two percent (92%) Subway Alumni.

== Celebrity Subway Alumni ==
- Jon Bon Jovi
- Vince Vaughn
- Ronald Reagan
- Dick Vitale
- Bing Crosby
- Bob Hope
- Shane Gillis
- Taylor Swift
- Miles Teller
- George Wendt
- Martin Sheen
- Curly Lambeau
- Dean Norris
- Robert Barron
- Jim Caviezel
- David Robinson
- The High Kings
- Sheamus
- Danny Boy O'Connor
