= Ron Lee (American football) =

American football player (born 1953)

- Lee in 1977

No. 34
- Position: Running back

Personal information
- Born: September 17, 1953 (age 73); Bellaire, Ohio, U.S.
- Listed height: 6 ft 4 in (1.93 m)
- Listed weight: 234 lb (106 kg)

Career information
- High school: Bellaire
- College: West Virginia
- NFL draft: 1976: 3rd round, 90th overall pick

Career history
- Baltimore Colts (1976–1978)

Career NFL statistics
- Carries: 206
- Rushing yards: 940
- Rushing touchdowns: 5
- Stats at Pro Football Reference

Ron Lee (born September 17, 1953) is an American former professional football player who was a running back for four seasons for the Baltimore Colts of the National Football League (NFL). He played college football for the West Virginia Mountaineers.

Throughout his college and professional football career Lee alternated at both the halfback and fullback positions. He played fullback at Bellaire High School in Bellaire, Ohio where he had 1,242 yards rushing and 144 points in his career. He is a member of the Bellaire High School Hall of Fame.
