= Bellaire, Ohio =

- Village
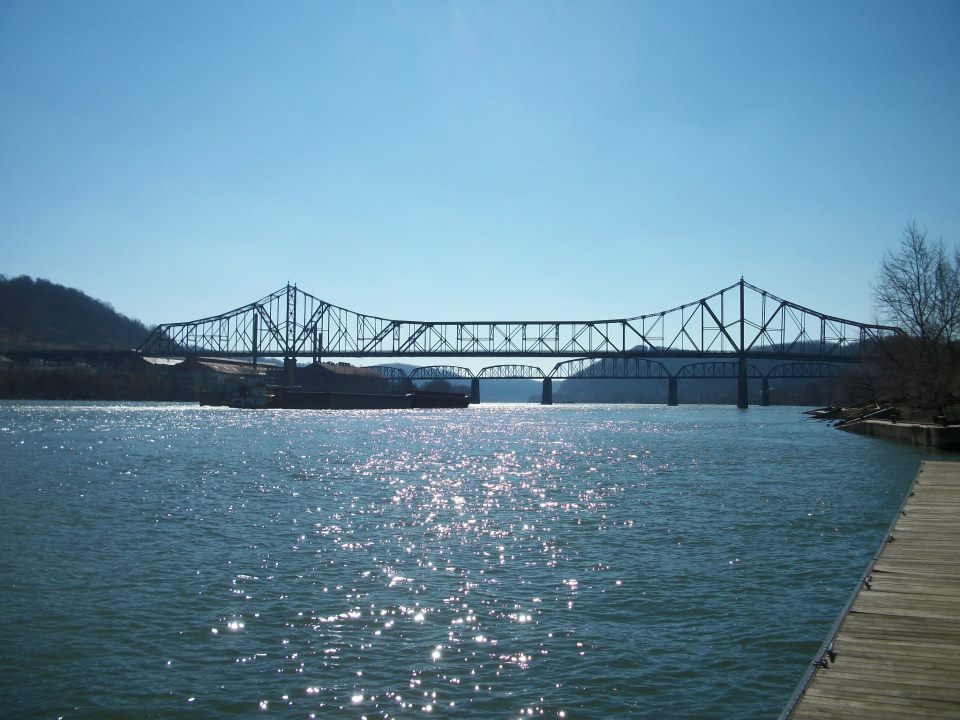
- Bellaire Bridge over the Ohio River

- Seal
- Motto: "Working Toward A Better Tomorrow"
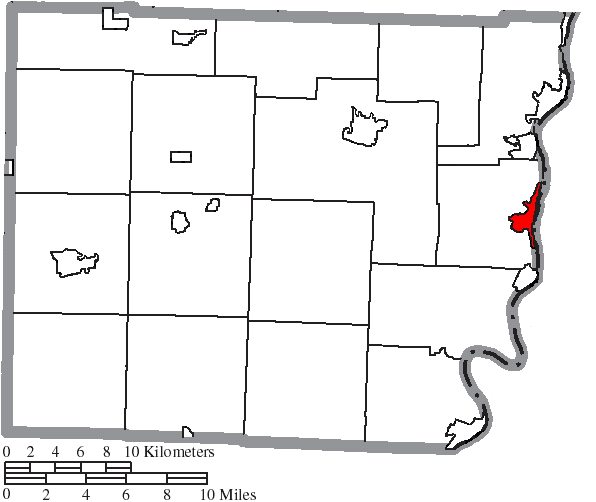
- Location of Bellaire in Belmont County, Ohio

- Location within Ohio Location within the United States
- Coordinates: 40°00′40″N 80°44′50″W
- Country: United States
- State: Ohio
- County: Belmont
- Township: Pultney

Area
  - Total: 1.68 sq mi (4.35 km^{2})
  - Land: 1.65 sq mi (4.28 km^{2})
  - Water: 0.027 sq mi (0.07 km^{2})
- Elevation: 709 ft (216 m)

Population (2020)
  - Total: 3,870
  - Estimate (2023): 3,763
  - Density: 2,341.7/sq mi (904.14/km^{2})
- Time zone: UTC-5 (Eastern (EST))
  - Summer (DST): UTC-4 (EDT)
- ZIP code: 43906
- Area code: 740
- FIPS code: 39-05074
- GNIS feature ID: 2398073
- Website: villageofbellaire.org

Bellaire is a village in Belmont County, Ohio, United States, along the Ohio River. The population was 3,870 at the 2020 census, having peaked in 1920. It is part of the Wheeling metropolitan area.

The Bellaire Bridge (now abandoned and closed) was filmed in the 1991 motion picture The Silence of the Lambs. The curved railroad viaduct and bridge over the Ohio, the B & O Railroad Viaduct, were featured in the 2010 film Unstoppable and is a registered historic structure.

== History ==
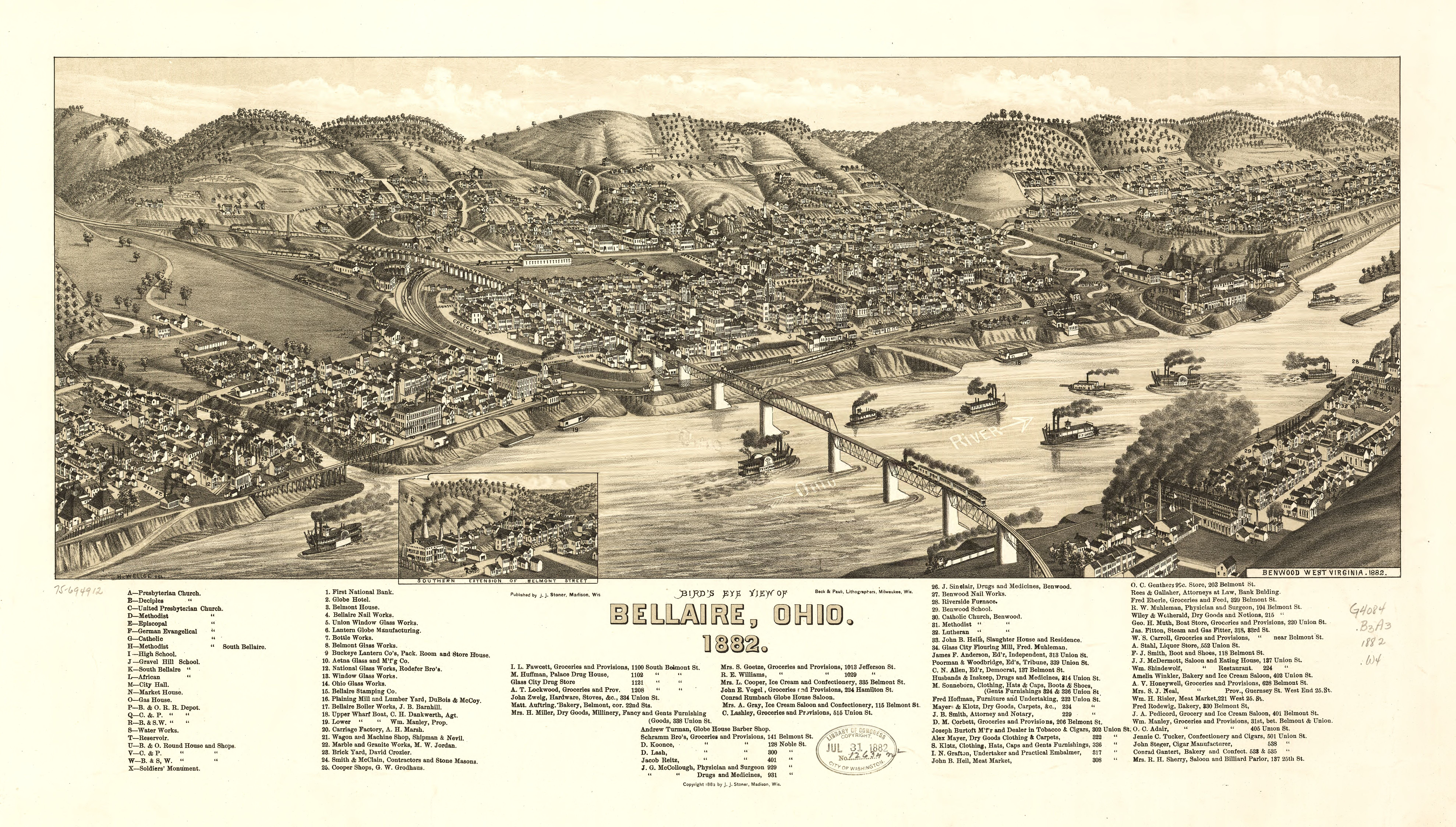
An 1882 bird's eye view of Bellaire

Mound builders occupied numerous areas along the Ohio River and built complex earthworks. None of their distinctive prehistoric remains has been found within the present-day city limits. The Mingo, Shawnee, and Delaware were historic tribes who inhabited the area at the time of European encounter and settlement. The latter were involved in the Northwest Indian Wars after settlement began in the post- Revolutionary War years. Unhappy that the United States had ignored their grievances in the 1789 Treaty of Fort Harmar, the Indians tried to push out the settlers over the next several years.

The first documented European visitors to the Ohio River Valley and this area were French trappers and priests in the early and mid-1700s. They were impressed with the river's heavily wooded and hilly shores, and with the abundance of fish and wildlife. The young George Washington had explored and surveyed lands in the Ohio River Valley before the Revolutionary War. After the war, he supported plans to have the federal government make land grants to veterans as payment for their services, in lieu of cash.

The ownership of the land changed hands sporadically, through speculation and conflicts over land deeds. John Rodefer and Jacob Davis purchased a shared majority of land for a village, which they realized in 1834. They surveyed six acres of building lot sites north of what is today Twenty-Seventh Street West toward Belmont Street. They named it Bell Air after Davis's former home in Maryland. Soon after, other settlers began to buy lots, and the town began to grow. Jacob Heatherington was the builder of the real House That Jack Built, referring to his Mule Jack who pulled the supplies to build the house to the site. Upon completion of the house, Jacob led Jack through every room of the house to show Jack what it looked like.

The first big boost for growth came with the construction of the Central Ohio Railroad in 1853, later absorbed by the Baltimore and Ohio, and the Stone Viaduct Bridge (opened in 1871) that carried it to Wheeling, West Virginia. The B&O reached Wheeling in January 1853, having started construction at Baltimore, Maryland, in 1857. It was the means by which the East Coast city, a port on Chesapeake Bay, could connect with western markets and compete with New York City and the Erie Canal. Col. John Sullivan campaigned for the connection from Bellaire. The town was renamed Bellaire by the railroad company.

Bellaire had some strategic importance during the Civil War. Its location on the Ohio River meant that it was on the border between the state of Ohio (pro-Union) and the state of Virginia (voted to secede from the Union). Railroads on both sides of the river added to the strategic significance. For these reasons, Camp Jefferson was established in Bellaire as a military training camp, and was often departure point for Union soldiers using the Baltimore and Ohio Railroad to move to the southeast.

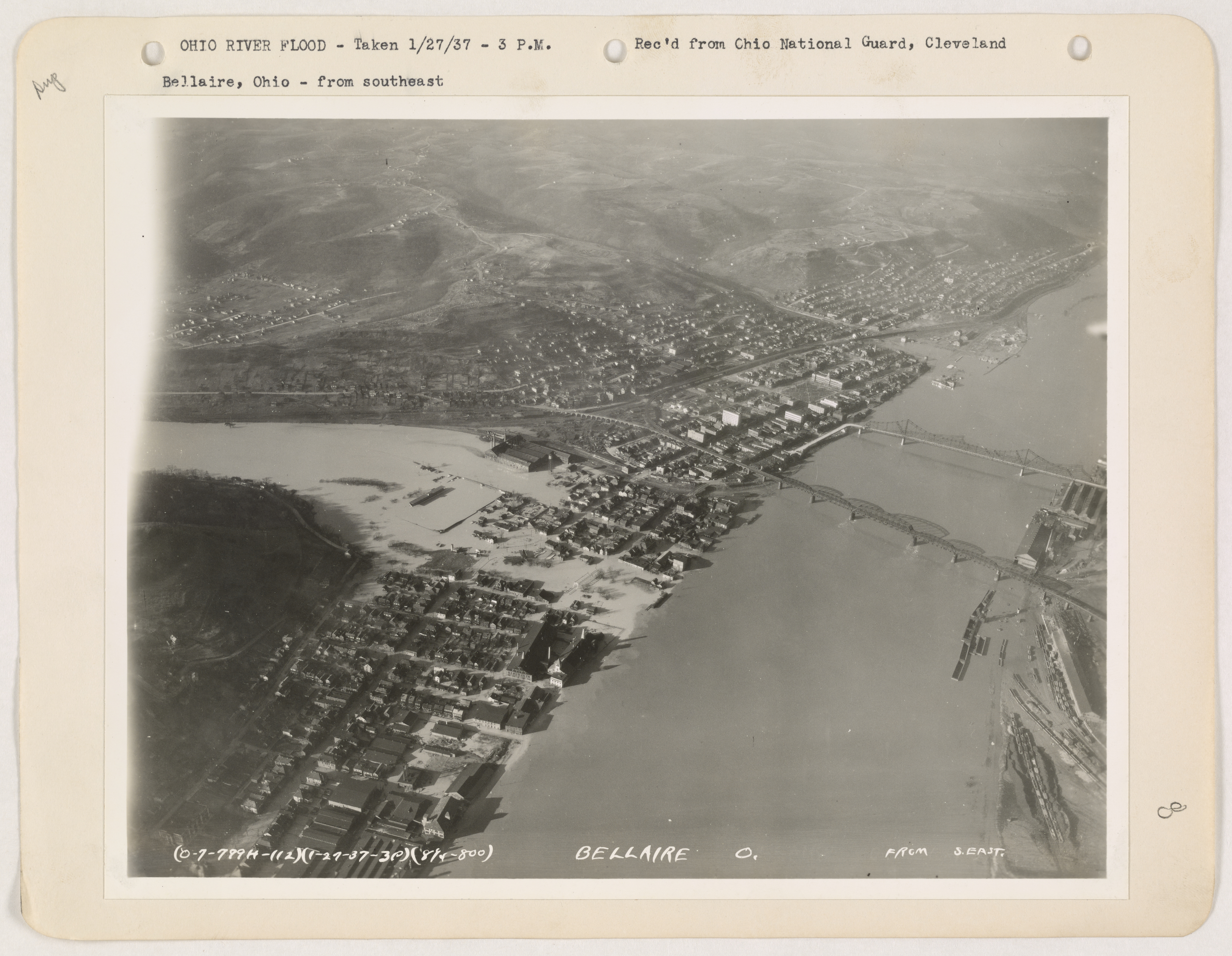
Flooding of the Ohio River in 1937

Bellaire gained the title of "Glass City" for the period of 1870 to 1885. The area had modern transportation, an energy source, and a skilled workforce. The transportation infrastructure included the Ohio River, the National Road, and railroads, including the Baltimore & Ohio Railroad and the Central Ohio Railroad. Coal was the local energy source, as Belmont County was part of the eastern Ohio coal region. A skilled workforce was located within the region, since glass had been made across the river in Wheeling since the 1820s. Some of the glass-making facilities of the time were Belmont Glass Works, Bellaire Window Glass Company, Rodefer-Gleason Glass Company, Star Glass Works, National Glass Manufacturing Company, Bellaire Goblet Works, Union Window Glass Company, and Enterprise Window Glass Company. In the next decade, the list also included the Bellaire Bottle Company, the Century Glass Company, and the Imperial Glass Company. The discovery of natural gas in the Findlay, Ohio, area in the late 1880s drew many manufacturers from Bellaire to the west, where the region around Toledo and Fostoria became the new center for Ohio's glass industry.

During the Bituminous Coal Miners' Strike of 1894, the National Guard was called up to protect the region's coal mines, and on June 13, there was a violent clash between strikers and national guard troops just west of town.

=== Imperial Glass Museum ===
Among dozens of local manufacturers, the Imperial Glass Company, founded in 1901 by Edward Muhleman, a riverman and financier, first made glass in 1904. It specialized in the mass production of attractive and affordable pressed-glass tableware, using continuous-feed melting tanks. One of the largest American handmade glass manufacturers during the 20th century, Imperial also produced blown glass, several lines of art glass, and its trademark "Candlewick" pattern. Bellaire's glassmaking era finally ended when the "Big I" closed its door in 1984. The building was razed in 1995. Its diverse products remain highly prized by glass collectors.

The Imperial Glass Museum contains displays of Imperial Glassware, as well as other Bellaire glassware, from the Ohio Valley Glass and Artifacts Museum. The museum is dedicated to the glassware and people who worked at Imperial. The National Imperial Glass (NIG) Collectors Society intends to keep alive the story of Imperial through the museum. Imperial was one of the largest and most diverse of the companies that made up the American handmade glass industry.

== Geography ==
According to the United States Census Bureau, the village has a total area of 1.68 square miles (4.35 km^{2}), of which 1.65 square miles (4.27 km^{2}) is land and 0.03 square miles (0.08 km^{2}) is water.

== Demographics ==
Historical population
| Census | Pop. | Note | %± |
|---|---|---|---|
| 1860 | 1,466 | | — |
| 1870 | 4,033 | | 175.1% |
| 1880 | 8,025 | | 99.0% |
| 1890 | 9,934 | | 23.8% |
| 1900 | 9,912 | | −0.2% |
| 1910 | 12,946 | | 30.6% |
| 1920 | 15,061 | | 16.3% |
| 1930 | 13,327 | | −11.5% |
| 1940 | 13,799 | | 3.5% |
| 1950 | 12,573 | | −8.9% |
| 1960 | 11,502 | | −8.5% |
| 1970 | 9,655 | | −16.1% |
| 1980 | 8,231 | | −14.7% |
| 1990 | 6,028 | | −26.8% |
| 2000 | 4,892 | | −18.8% |
| 2010 | 4,278 | | −12.6% |
| 2020 | 3,870 | | −9.5% |
| 2023 (est.) | 3,763 | ▼ | −2.8% |
U.S. Decennial Census

=== 2020 census ===
As of the 2020 census, Bellaire had a population of 3,870. The median age was 41.7 years. 20.5% of residents were under the age of 18 and 17.8% of residents were 65 years of age or older. For every 100 females there were 96.6 males, and for every 100 females age 18 and over there were 93.6 males age 18 and over.

100.0% of residents lived in urban areas, while 0.0% lived in rural areas.

There were 1,714 households in Bellaire, of which 25.9% had children under the age of 18 living in them. Of all households, 27.7% were married-couple households, 26.0% were households with a male householder and no spouse or partner present, and 35.8% were households with a female householder and no spouse or partner present. About 37.0% of all households were made up of individuals and 15.5% had someone living alone who was 65 years of age or older.

There were 2,050 housing units, of which 16.4% were vacant. The homeowner vacancy rate was 1.4% and the rental vacancy rate was 10.3%.

Racial composition as of the 2020 census
| Race | Number | Percent |
|---|---|---|
| White | 3,333 | 86.1% |
| Black or African American | 231 | 6.0% |
| American Indian and Alaska Native | 15 | 0.4% |
| Asian | 4 | 0.1% |
| Native Hawaiian and Other Pacific Islander | 0 | 0.0% |
| Some other race | 18 | 0.5% |
| Two or more races | 269 | 7.0% |
| Hispanic or Latino (of any race) | 79 | 2.0% |

=== 2010 census ===
As of the census of 2010, there were 4,278 people, 1,836 households, and 1,056 families living in the village. The population density was 2,592.7 inhabitants per square mile (1,001.0/km^{2}). There were 2,187 housing units at an average density of 1,325.5 per square mile (511.8/km^{2}). The racial makeup of the village was 91.9% White, 5.5% African American, 0.3% Native American, 0.2% Asian, and 2.2% from two or more races. Hispanic or Latino of any race were 0.8% of the population.

There were 1,836 households, of which 28.9% had children under the age of 18 living with them, 33.3% were married couples living together, 17.9% had a female householder with no husband present, 6.3% had a male householder with no wife present, and 42.5% were non-families. 36.3% of all households were made up of individuals, and 14.7% had someone living alone who was 65 years of age or older. The average household size was 2.32 and the average family size was 3.01.

The median age in the village was 38.9 years. 23.4% of residents were under the age of 18; 9.1% were between the ages of 18 and 24; 25.7% were from 25 to 44; 26% were from 45 to 64; and 15.9% were 65 years of age or older. The gender makeup of the village was 47.9% male and 52.1% female.

=== 2000 census ===
As of the census of 2000, there were 4,892 people, 2,110 households, and 1,299 families living in the village. The population density was 2,781.5 inhabitants per square mile (1,073.9/km^{2}). There were 2,507 housing units at an average density of 1,425.4 per square mile (550.4/km^{2}). The racial makeup of the village was 92.07% White, 5.70% African American, 0.12% Native American, 0.18% Asian, 0.02% Pacific Islander, 0.14% from other races, and 1.76% from two or more races. Hispanic or Latino of any race were 0.31% of the population.

There were 2,110 households, out of which 27.2% had children under the age of 18 living with them, 38.2% were married couples living together, 18.5% had a female householder with no husband present, and 38.4% were non-families. 34.4% of all households were made up of individuals, and 18.8% had someone living alone who was 65 years of age or older. The average household size was 2.31 and the average family size was 2.95.

In the village, the population was spread out, with 24.1% under the age of 18, 7.0% from 18 to 24, 26.7% from 25 to 44, 21.8% from 45 to 64, and 20.4% who were 65 years of age or older. The median age was 40 years. For every 100 females, there were 84.3 males. For every 100 females age 18 and over, there were 77.4 males.

The median income for a household in the village was $19,480, and the median income for a family was $25,185. Males had a median income of $26,639 versus $16,101 for females. The per capita income for the village was $13,912. About 21.1% of families and 27.1% of the population were below the poverty line, including 32.0% of those under age 18 and 20.6% of those age 65 or over.

== Education ==
Bellaire is home to Bellaire High School and St. John Central Academy (formerly St. John Central High School). Bellaire Public Library is housed in the Mellott Memorial Building.

== Notable people ==
- Mike Basrak, former professional football center in the National Football League
- John Buddenberg, University of Akron football player, drafted to NFL by Cleveland Browns, CFL, WLAF Sacramento Surge
- Mac Cara, former professional football End in the National Football League
- Lester Carney, won a silver medal in the 200 m at the 1960 Summer Olympics
- Henry Crimmel, American Civil War veteran and co-founder of Novelty Glass Company
- Nate Davis, professional football quarterback in the National Football League
- Jose Davis, Kent State QB, professional football in the CFL and AFL
- Andy Dorris, former professional football defensive lineman in the NFL
- Abraham Feinberg, rabbi.
- Todd Fitch, former interim head football coach at Vanderbilt University, assistant coach at several Division 1 college football programs
- Joey Galloway, professional football wide receiver in the NFL and ESPN analyst
- Bill George, former pitcher in Major League Baseball for the New York Giants and the Columbus Solons
- Tod Goodwin, former professional football player in the NFL for the New York Giants
- Carl C. Johnson, retired U.S. Army Air Force/U.S. Army officer, former Cleveland, Ohio, Airport Commissioner, former deputy director Pittsburgh International Airport, and last Tuskegee Airmen cadet pilot graduate
- George "Chappie" Johnson Jr., former baseball catcher and field manager in the Negro leagues who crossed racial boundaries as a teacher and coach.
- Jim Keane, former professional football player in the NFL for the Chicago Bears
- Brickyard Kennedy, former professional Major League Baseball pitcher in first World Series
- Ron Lee, former professional football player in the NFL for the Baltimore Colts
- Ted Levine, actor
- John McVay, head coach of NFL's New York Giants, general manager of San Francisco 49ers, father of Los Angeles Rams coach Sean McVay
- Lance Mehl, former professional football linebacker for the New York Jets of the NFL.
- Bob Ney, former U.S. House Representative, convicted in Jack Abramoff scandal
- John Niemiec, Notre Dame football star for Knute Rockne, coach at Columbia College, Iowa (now known as Loras College).
- Stan Olejniczak, former professional football player in the NFL for the Pittsburgh Pirates
- Aaron Perzanowski, legal scholar, author, and professor at the University of Michigan Law School
- Bull Polisky, former professional football player in the NFL for the Chicago Bears
- Stephen Rodefer, poet
- Nick Skorich, former Guard for Pittsburgh Steelers in NFL, former head coach of Cleveland Browns and Philadelphia Eagles, supervisor of NFL officials
- Ben Taylor, former professional football linebacker in the NFL
- Chalmers Tschappat, early NFL player
- Francis Wallace author, Hollywood screenwriter, American sportswriter, and commentator for radio and television broadcasts
- Sol White, infielder, manager, sportswriter, member of National Baseball Hall of Fame
