= B & O Railroad Viaduct =

- U.S. National Register of Historic Places
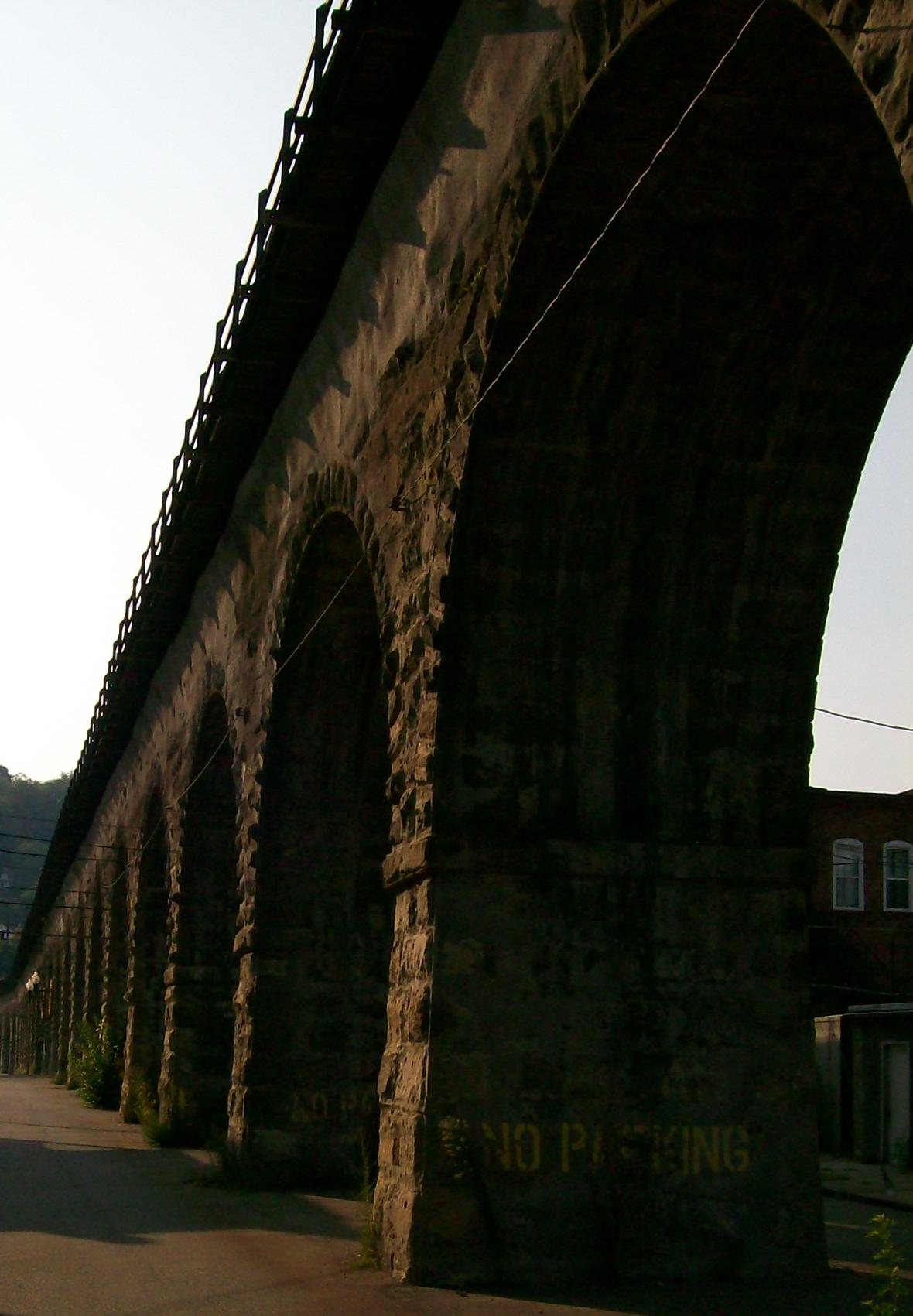
- The Bellaire Viaduct at the intersection of 31st and Union Streets in Bellaire, Ohio.
- Location: Bellaire, Ohio and Benwood, West Virginia
- Coordinates: 40°0′43″N 80°44′20″W
- Architect: Wendel Bollman and Jacob Hayes Linville
- NRHP reference No.: 76001370
- Added to NRHP: June 22, 1976

B & O Railroad Viaduct is a historic structure in Bellaire, Ohio and Benwood, West Virginia, listed in the National Register of Historic Places on June 22, 1976.

== History ==
=== Bridge ===
The B&O Railroad's first bridge across the Ohio River, built in 1857, served a rail line through Parkersburg, West Virginia. But the growing center of Chicago, Illinois, made a span between Benwood, West Virginia, and Bellaire, Ohio more desirable.

In 1865, the B&O obtained the Central Ohio Railroad and later the Sandusky, Mansfield & Newark Railroad. These acquisitions linked Bellaire to the port of Sandusky on the shore of Lake Erie, and thence to Chicago. The proposal to build a bridge at Bellaire threatened a ferry business there, whose owners sought and obtained an injunction which was filed in court. The railroad fought the injunction to the U.S. Supreme Court and won.

Discussions into the building of the bridge began in the late 1860s and it was decided that the bridge would be a long-span wrought-iron-truss. The design of the bridge was handled by Jacob Linville, president of the Keystone Bridge Co., which manufactured its trusses. The bridge was completed in 1871. The approaches are made of cut sandstone blocks that elevate the rail line to the recommended height. The bridge itself consists of all wrought-iron trusswork resting on six cut stone piers sunk into the river bed.

The bridge was featured in the 2010 film Unstoppable starring Denzel Washington and Chris Pine. Filming on the bridge in Bellaire ran from November 9 to 14, 2009.

=== Bridge spans ===
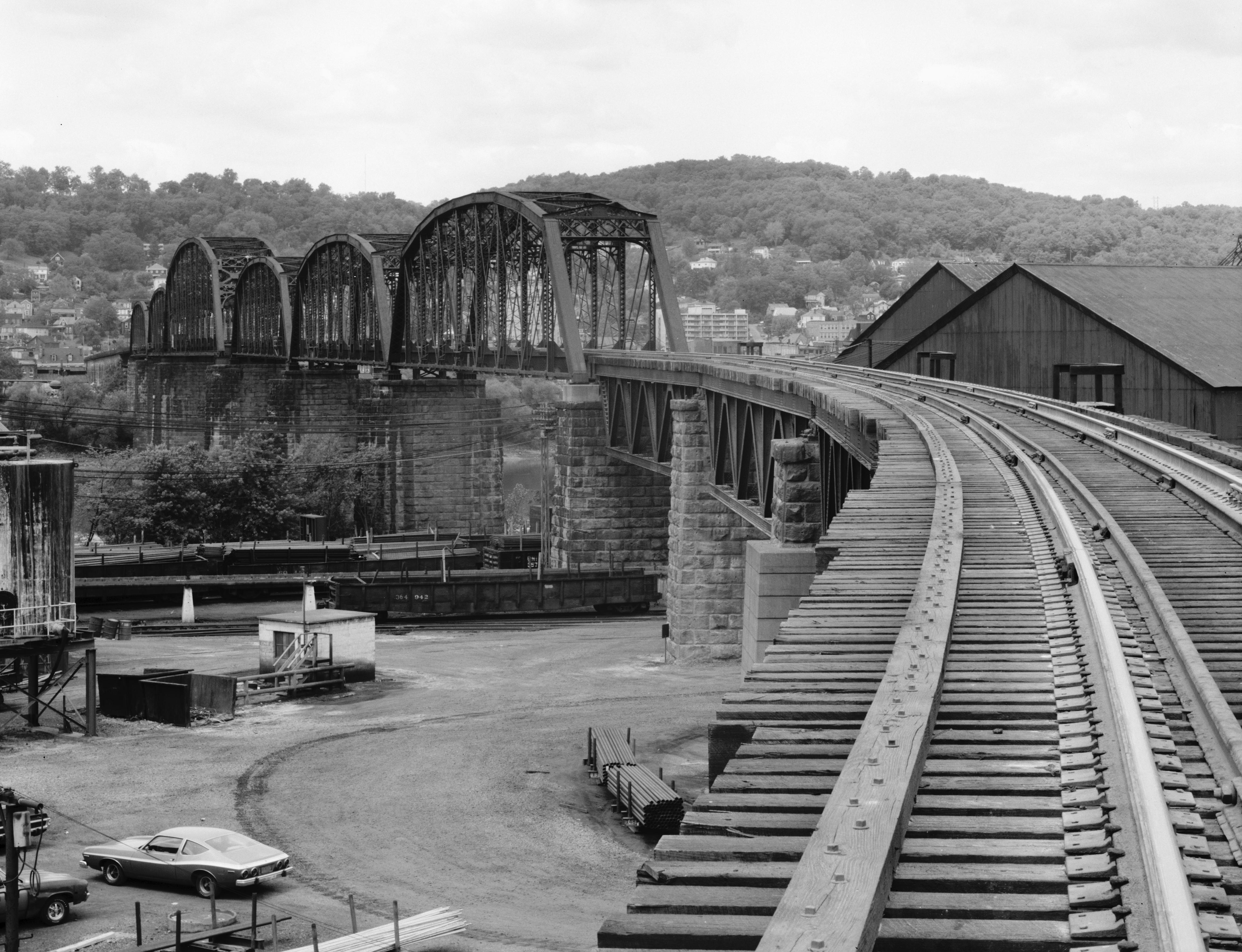
The span in Benwood, West Virginia

The spans to the bridge were completed in 1870. The Bellaire span contains 43 arched spans measuring 33 feet 4 inches (10.16 m) wide and varying from 10 to 20 feet (3.0 to 6.1 m) in height over the roadways of downtown Bellaire. The span comes down from the north and curves at 6 degrees to the east. Each span contains 37 stones, representing the 37 states at the time of completion.

The span in Benwood contains stone piers with iron truss-work supporting the railway above. The span comes in from the south and curves 270 degrees to the west. The span traverses several manufacturing sites and comes within feet of West Virginia Route 2.

In total, the entire span contains 14,854 cubic yards (11,357 m^{3}) of masonry, the piers and abutments contain 25,375 cubic yards (19,401 m^{3}). The bridge span is 8,566 feet (2,611 m) in length and the total cost was over $1,000,000. (Note: US$1,000,000 in 1870 is equivalent to $25.5 million in 2025, according to calculations based on the consumer price index measure of inflation.)

== Historic uses ==
- Rail-related

== See also ==
- List of bridges documented by the Historic American Engineering Record in Ohio
- List of bridges documented by the Historic American Engineering Record in West Virginia
- Unstoppable (2010 film)
