= Chalmers Tschappat =

American football player (1896–1958)

Profile
- Position: Tackle

Personal information
- Born: June 22, 1896; Bellaire, Ohio, U.S.
- Died: February 6, 1958 (aged 61); Fairborn, Ohio, U.S.
- Listed height: 5 ft 11 in (1.80 m)
- Listed weight: 180 lb (82 kg)

Career information
- High school: Bellaire
- College: West Virginia Wesleyan

Career history
- Dayton Triangles (1921)
- Stats at Pro Football Reference

John Chalmers Tschappat Jr. (June 22, 1896 – February 6, 1958), sometimes listed as John Franklin Tschappat, was an American football player. He played at the tackle position for the Dayton Triangles of the American Professional Football Association (later renamed the National Football League) (NFL) during the 1921 APFA season, the second regular season of the National Football League.

Tschappat was born in Bellaire, Ohio in 1896 and later attended Bellaire High School. His father, John Tschappat Sr., was an Ohio native who was employed as a boiler maker.

Tschappat played college football at West Virginia Wesleyan College in 1916. In 1918, Walter Camp's Spalding's Official Foot Ball Guide named Tschappat to its All-West Virginia eleven. Tschappat also studied chemistry as a special student at Ohio State University in 1917.

During the World War I era, he served in the United States Army Medical Department from June 1918 to March 1919 and was stationed at the Medical Detachment, Infirmary Convalescent Center, Camp Hancock, Georgia. He became a sergeant.

After his discharge from the military, Tschappat returned to Ohio. In the fall of 1919, in the early days of professional football in the Ohio League, he served as the line coach for Bellaire Athletic Association team during the 1919 season.

In the fall of 1921, he played at the tackle position for the 1921 Dayton Triangles of the American Professional Football Association during the 1921 APFA season, the second regular season of the NFL.

He is buried at Greenwood Cemetery, Bellaire, Ohio.

He is a member of the Bellaire High School Wall of Fame.
