= Huddle (film) =

1932 film

- Directed by: Sam Wood
- Written by: Francis Wallace (based on the story by); Walton Hall Smith; C. Gardner Sullivan (dialogue continuity); Robert Lee Johnson; Arthur S. Hyman (adaptation); Crilly Butler; Elbridge Anderson (technical detail)
- Starring: Ramon Novarro; Madge Evans; Una Merkel; Ralph Graves; John Arledge; Kane Richmond; Martha Sleeper; Henry Armetta
- Cinematography: Harold Wenstrom
- Edited by: Hugh Wynn
- Production company: Metro-Goldwyn-Mayer
- Distributed by: Metro-Goldwyn-Mayer
- Release date: May 14, 1932
- Running time: 103 minutes
- Country: United States
- Language: English
- Budget: $514,000
- Box office: $809,000

Huddle is a 1932 American pre-Code sports drama film directed by Sam Wood and starring Ramon Novarro, Madge Evans, Ralph Graves and Una Merkel. This was the first of two films Ramon Novarro would make in 1932, and his first after appearing in the acclaimed, successful Mata Hari.

== Plot ==
Tony Ametto, a young steel-worker with immigrant parents, gets a scholarship to Yale, where he becomes a football star and finds romance with a young heiress.

== Production ==
Director Sam Wood was known for directing college-themed films such as One Minute to Play (1926) and So This Is College (1929). The film showcases the popularity of the college film subgenre of culture-clash plot elements that were the focus of comedies like Hold 'Em Yale (1928) with Rod La Rocque, and the drama Redskin (1929) with Richard Dix.

The film was shot on a considerable budget of $514,000, and included recreating Yale's Derby Day on the MGM backlot. Shooting began on February 12, 1932, and lasted for nine weeks.

Real college students for the film were recruited as extras for $5-a-day; while presumably providing authentic atmosphere to the crowd scenes, they were also cheaper to hire than the average professional film extra in Los Angeles, whose pay was set at $7.50. One of the extras in the film was a pre-fame Buster Crabbe, who appeared in a few scenes before being fired because of "inadvertent rudeness to the star (Novarro) during rehearsals." All American football stars Merger Asplit, Gene Clark, Dale Van Sickel, Jess Hibbs, Ernie Pinkert and Manfred Vezie appeared in the film as well to lend authenticity to the football game plays.

Lead actor Novarro had to learn football and soccer for his role (his character plays football in the American release, soccer in the international versions). He considered himself miscast; Robert Montgomery was originally considered for the role. Aged 33, and not a natural athlete, Novarro's casting as a hardscrabble college football star was a strange decision; when Greta Garbo heard of his new role, she reportedly said of their bosses at MGM, "Oh, they'll never learn." Historian Mark A. Vieira credits Novarro's decision to accept the "dubious role" as payback to MGM chief executive Irving Thalberg for allowing him the autonomy to direct the foreign language versions of Call of the Flesh (1929).

== Release ==
The film went into general release on May 14, 1932 and had its New York City premiere at the Capitol Theatre a month later on June 16. In general release, the film was a box office failure, with a loss of $28,000. Critics almost universally described it as too long and agreed that Novarro was miscast.

Huddle has been broadcast on television occasionally and has played several times on the cable channel Turner Classic Movies. It was released on DVD through Warner Archive Collection on October 5, 2010.

== Box office ==
The film earned theatrical rentals of $809,000: $476,000 from the US and Canada and $333,000 elsewhere resulting in a loss of $28,000.

== See also ==
- List of American football films
