= Central Ohio Railroad =

Map

The Central Ohio Railroad was the third railroad to enter Columbus, Ohio, and the first to connect Columbus with the east coast. It eventually became a part of the Baltimore and Ohio Railroad.

== History ==
It was realized that a railroad from Bellaire on the west side of the Ohio River across from Wheeling would be a valuable franchise for moving goods to and from the east coast. Chartered in February, 1847 by interests in Zanesville, the CO was to prove difficult to construct.

=== Construction challenges ===
Eastern Ohio proved a difficult location for a railroad. Obstacles included the Muskingum River at Zanesville, 700 feet (210 m) of excavation through the hard sandstone of the Blackhand Gorge along the Licking River between Zanesville and Newark, and large quantities of fill and trestle work along the Big Walnut Creek. A tunnel in Cambridge had rockfalls and a cut near Barnesville had landslides.

=== Operation begins ===
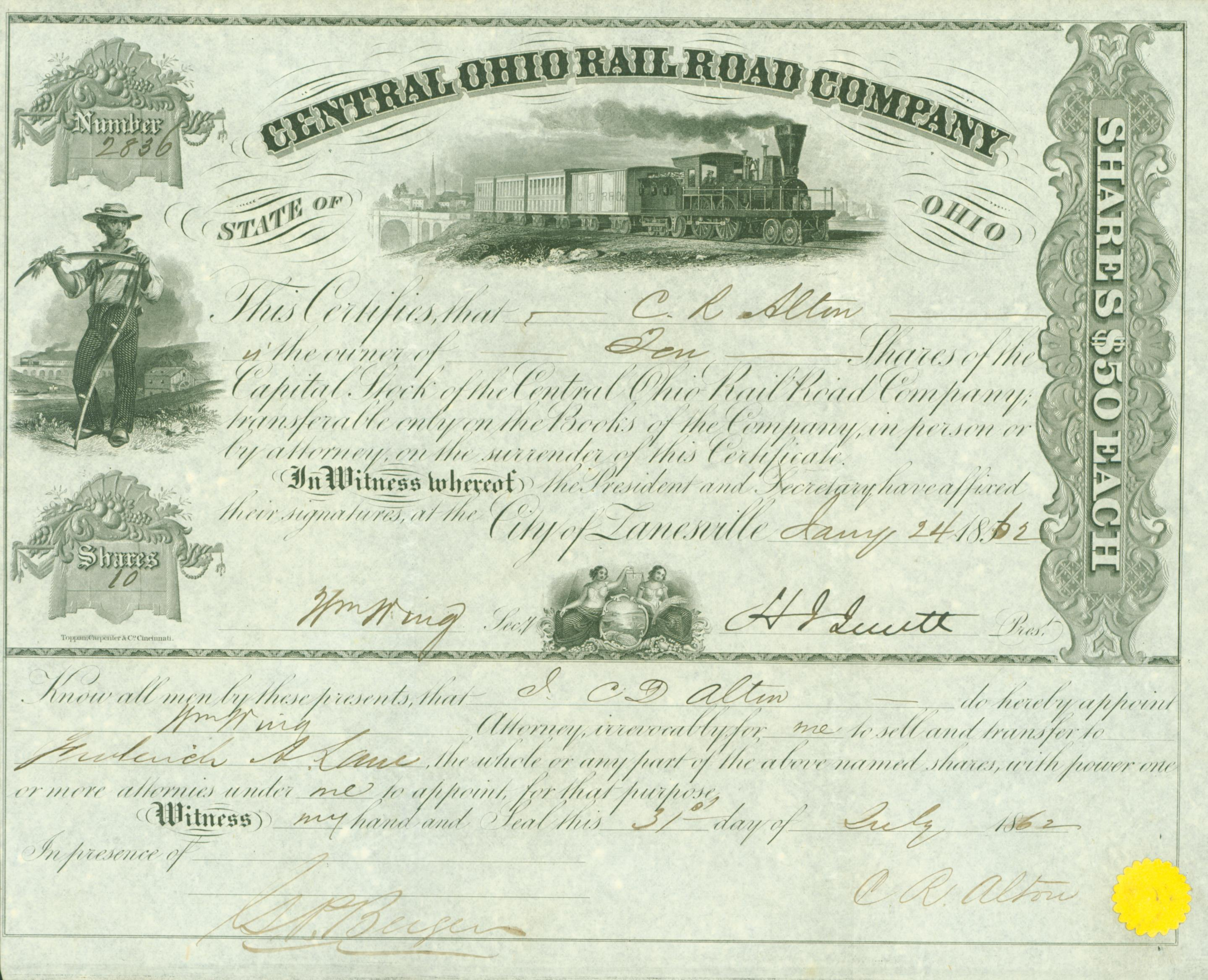
Share of the Central Ohio Rail Road Company, issued 24. August 1862

On January 19, 1852, trains began running between Zanesville and Newark. A year later trains ran from Newark to Columbus. Finally, in November 1854 the entire line was open between Bellaire and Columbus. The Baltimore and Ohio Railroad had been completed from Baltimore through Pittsburgh to Wheeling in 1852, so rail through rail service, except for the Ohio River Crossing, was afforded from Columbus to Baltimore and on to New York City. The railroad entered Columbus from the east passing near what is now Port Columbus Airport, crossed Alum Creek and Nelson Road south of Fifth Avenue and past the Barracks where it swung around southwestward to enter Union Station.

=== A struggle to operate ===
The poorly constructed line had an unballasted roadbed, and damage to engines and cars due to derailments was expensive and frequent. A lack of passing sidings rendered regular schedules impossible to meet. There weren't enough freight and passenger cars, and the maintenance facilities were inadequate. Due to the expense of constructing the line, no more credit was available to fix these shortcomings. The CO attempted to pay off its indebtedness from revenue, but fell into receivership in 1857 where it remained for several years.

=== Civil War traffic and the B&O ===
Due to wartime revenue and traffic increases, the CO was able to exit bankruptcy in December 1865. The B&O, which had acquired an interest in the CO to keep it going during the war, leased the railroad and began a capital improvements program. In 1871 a stone and steel bridge crossed the Ohio River between Bellaire and Wheeling, greatly improving service. Part of the bridge infrastructure included the B & O Railroad Viaduct. The line remained a part of the B&O Railroad although parts of it were shared with the Pennsylvania Railroad in later years.

=== After the B&O ===
In the late 1980s the rail line east of Cambridge was abandoned and the track was taken up. The remaining rail line became part of the Columbus & Ohio River Railroad (CUOH) and is now part of a 247-mile (398 km) short line freight railroad that interchanges with CSX Transportation, Ohio Central Railroad, Ohio Southern Railroad and Norfolk Southern and has been operated as part of Genesee & Wyoming railroad, since it was acquired by them in 2008.

== See also ==
- Baltimore and Ohio Railroad
- Columbus Union Station
