= Stan Olejniczak =

American football player and coach (1912–1979)

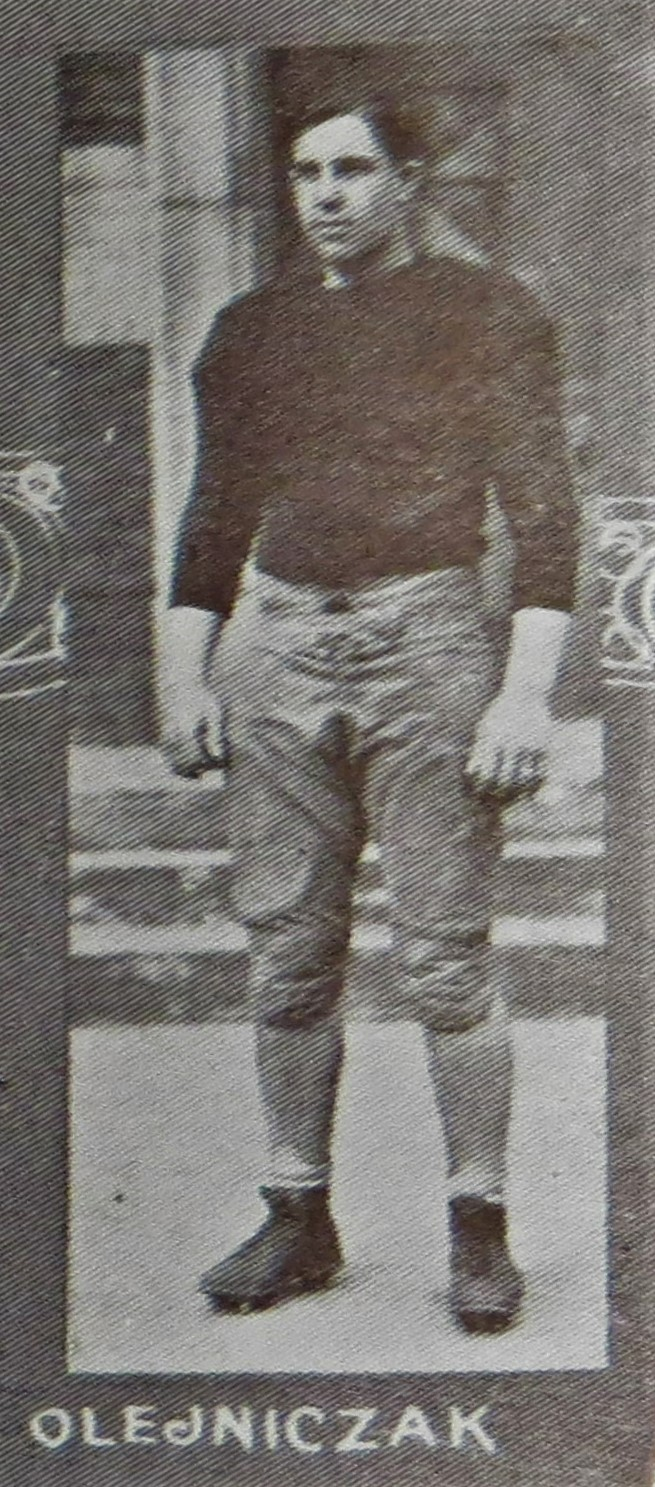
- Stanley Olejniczak - Bellaire High School

No. 30
- Position: Tackle

Personal information
- Born: May 31, 1912; Neffs, Ohio, U.S.
- Died: March 1979 (aged 66)
- Listed height: 6 ft 0 in (1.83 m)
- Listed weight: 220 lb (100 kg)

Career information
- High school: Bellaire (Bellaire, Ohio)
- College: Pittsburgh

Career history

Playing
- Pittsburgh Pirates (1935)

Coaching
- Halezton Mountaineers (1936–1937) (Asst); Halezton Mountaineers (1938–1942) (HC); Pittsburgh Panthers (1943–1945) (Asst)

Head coaching record
- Career: 39–9–1 (.806)
- Stats at Pro Football Reference

Stanley Joseph Olejniczak (May 31, 1912 – March 1979) was an American football tackle who played one season with the Pittsburgh Pirates of the National Football League (NFL). He played college football at the University of Pittsburgh and attended Bellaire High School in Bellaire, Ohio. He later changed his last name to "Olenn" after his football career.

== College career ==
Olejniczak lettered for the Pittsburgh Panthers in 1934.

== Professional career ==
Olejniczak played in twelve games, starting six, for the Pittsburgh Pirates during the 1935 season.

== Coaching career ==
Olejniczak was an assistant coach under George Shotwell for the Halezton High School Mountaineers in Hazleton, Pennsylvania from 1936 to 1937. He was then head coach of the Mountaineers from 1938 to 1942, accumulating a 39-9-1 record. He resigned in August 1943 after the school refused to grant him a leave of absence to remain coaching at the University of Pittsburgh.

Olejniczak was later an assistant coach for the Pittsburgh Panthers under his changed surname of Olenn from 1943 to 1945. He resigned from the team in January 1946 after he, along with assistant coaches Charles Hartwig and Bobby Hoel, refused to work under head coach Clark Shaughnessy. Shaughnessy became head coach of the Maryland Terrapins in February 1946.
