= Mac Cara =

American football player (1914–1993)

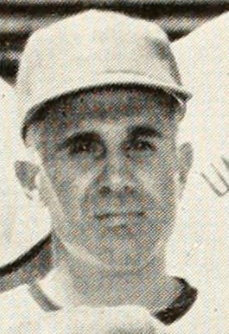
- Cara, c. 1956

No. 10
- Position: End

Personal information
- Born: November 11, 1914; Reggio di Calabria, Italy
- Died: April 16, 1993 (aged 78); Jefferson, Ohio, U.S.
- Listed height: 5 ft 10 in (1.78 m)
- Listed weight: 193 lb (88 kg)

Career information
- High school: Bellaire (Bellaire, Ohio)
- College: NC State (1933-1936)
- NFL draft: 1937: 10th round, 96th overall pick

Career history

Playing
- Pittsburgh Pirates (1937–1938)

Coaching
- Wheeling Ironmen (1963-1964) Assistant coach; Wheeling Ironmen (1965) Head coach

Career NFL statistics
- Receptions: 6
- Receiving yards: 54
- Stats at Pro Football Reference

Dominic "Mac" Anthony Cara (November 11, 1914 – April 16, 1993) was an American football end in the National Football League (NFL) for the Pittsburgh Pirates. He played college football at North Carolina State University and was drafted in the tenth round of the 1937 NFL draft. He graduated and played high school football at Bellaire, Ohio for Bellaire High School

After his NFL career ended, Cara became an assistant football coach at his alma mater of Bellaire High School, then became the head coach at Steubenville Catholic Central High School for eight seasons where he had two unbeaten teams. He later served as an assistant coach in college coaching wide receivers and tight ends at Georgetown University (1948), Mississippi State University (1949–1953), and University of Florida (1954–1959). He is a member of the Bellaire High School Hall of Fame.
