= Todd Fitch =

American football player and coach (born 1964)

Current position
- Title: Offensive coordinator & quarterbacks coach
- Team: Charlotte
- Conference: American

Biographical details
- Born: February 15, 1964 (age 62); Saline, Michigan, U.S.
- Education: Bowling Green

Playing career
- 1982–1985: Ohio Wesleyan
- Position: Defensive back

Coaching career (HC unless noted)
- 1986–1987: Ohio Wesleyan (GA)
- 1988: Bowling Green (GA)
- 1989: West Virginia (volunteer assistant)
- 1990–1991: Bowling Green (WR)
- 1992–1993: Colorado State (RB/ST)
- 1994–1995: Connecticut (QB)
- 1996–1998: Connecticut (OC)
- 1999–2001: South Carolina (WR)
- 2002: South Carolina (RB)
- 2003: South Carolina (QB)
- 2004–2006: Iowa State (QB)
- 2007–2009: East Carolina (OC/QB)
- 2010–2011: South Florida (OC/RB)
- 2012: South Florida (OC/QB)
- 2013–2014: Boston College (WR/PGC)
- 2015: Boston College (OC/QB)
- 2016–2017: Louisiana Tech (OC/WR)
- 2018–2019: Louisiana Tech (OC/QB)
- 2020: Vanderbilt (OC/QB)
- 2020: Vanderbilt (Interim HC)
- 2021–2023: Ohio State (OA)
- 2024: LSU (OA)
- 2025–present: Charlotte (OC/QB)

Head coaching record
- Overall: 0–1

Todd Armstrong Fitch (born February 15, 1964) is an American college football coach and former player. He is the offensive coordinator and quarterbacks coach at University of North Carolina at Charlotte. Fitch has served as an assistant coach at various programs since the mid-1980s. He was the interim head coach at Vanderbilt University for the final game of the 2020 season.

== Playing career ==
Fitch was born in Saline, Michigan. His family then lived in nearby Dundee, but eventually moved to Bellaire, Ohio. He graduated from Bellaire High School, where he played football, and then attended Ohio Wesleyan University in Delaware, Ohio. One of his best friends at Ohio Wesleyan was Tim Corbin, then two years ahead of him and the football student-manager. Fitch and Corbin were reunited in 2020 when Fitch became an assistant at Vanderbilt; Corbin had been the head baseball coach there since 2003. He played defensive back from 1982 to 1985, lettering 1983–1985, and earning All-North Coast Athletic Conference honors in 1985.

== Coaching career ==
Fitch served as the interim head coach for Vanderbilt following the firing of Derek Mason in the 2020 season. He coached in one game, a 42–17 loss to Tennessee.

== Head coaching record ==
Year	Team	Overall	Conference	Standing
Vanderbilt Commodores (Southeastern Conference) (2020)
2020	Vanderbilt	0–1	0–1	7th (Eastern)
Vanderbilt:		0–1	0–1	
Total:		0–1		
