= Chris Hoofnagle =

American online privacy law scholar

- Citizenship: American
- Known for: Survey research on consumer privacy, Federal Trade Commission
- Scientific career
- Fields: Privacy, computer crime, identity theft
- Notable students: Ashkan Soltani

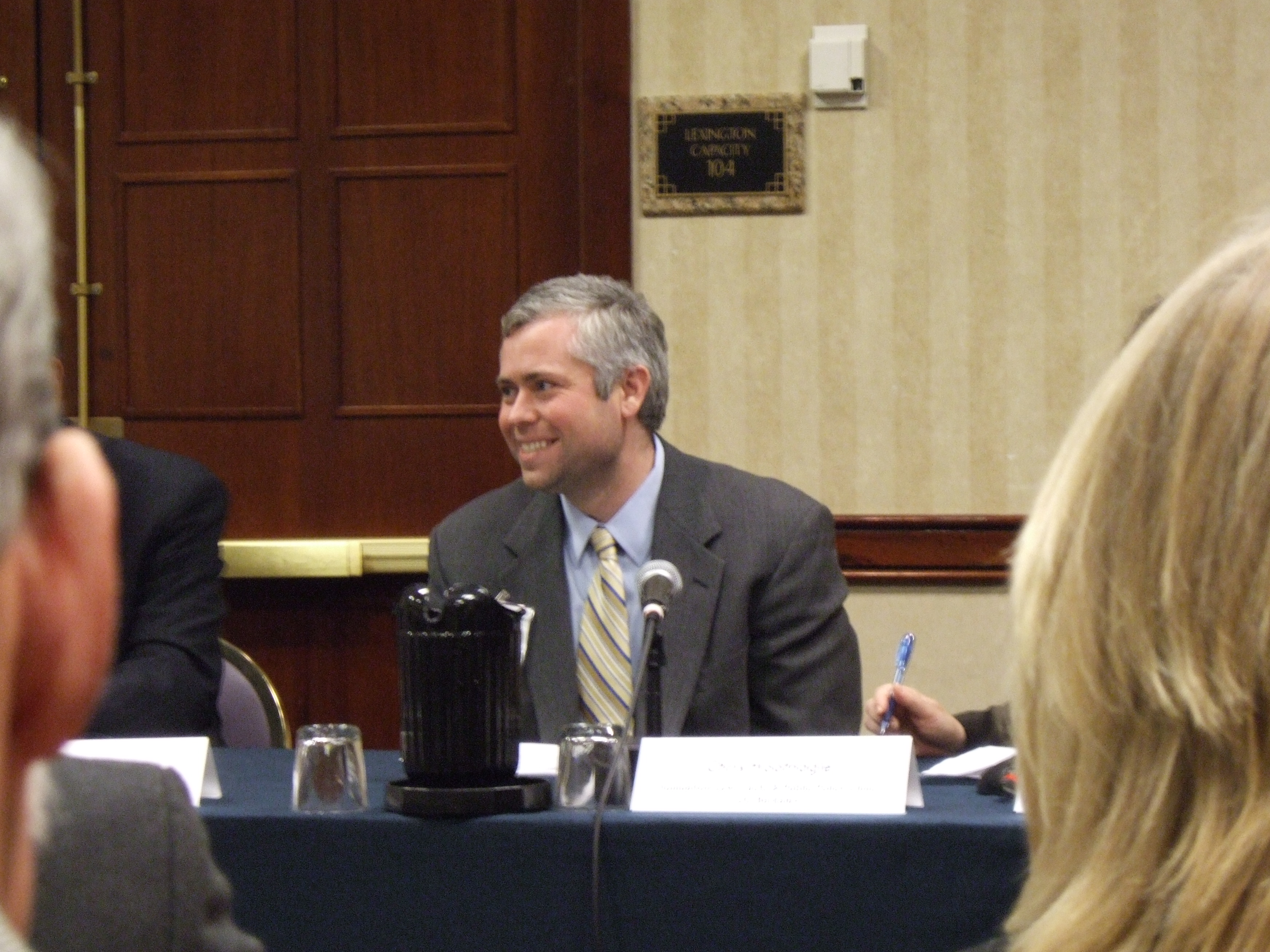
Chris Hoofnagle speaking at a panel.

Chris Jay Hoofnagle is an American professor at the University of California, Berkeley who teaches information privacy law, computer crime law, regulation of online privacy, internet law, and seminars on new technology. Hoofnagle has contributed to the privacy literature by writing privacy law legal reviews and conducting research on the privacy preferences of Americans. Notably, his research demonstrates that most Americans prefer not to be targeted online for advertising and despite claims to the contrary, young people care about privacy and take actions to protect it. Hoofnagle has written scholarly articles regarding identity theft, consumer privacy, U.S. and European privacy laws, and privacy policy suggestions.

== Career ==
Hoofnagle is a professor and attorney at Gunderson Dettmer LLP. He has served as an advisor for several student projects at the University of California, Berkeley School of Information. He advised Ashkan Soltani and his colleagues on their article "Flash Cookies and Privacy".

Hoofnagle and Soltani published a follow-up on this work in 2011 documenting the use of "HTTP ETags" to store persistent identifiers. This research was also published in the Harvard Policy Law Review as "Behavioral Advertising: The Offer You Cannot Refuse," and won the CPDP 2014 Multidisciplinary Privacy Research Award.

== Privacy literature contributions ==
=== Identity theft ===
Today, most information regarding identity theft incidents is gathered from the victims whose identities are being stolen. As a result, many aspects regarding identity theft are still unknown. This is because of missing data on synthetic identity theft (situations of identity theft where victims aren't aware of the crime), the fact that most victims don't report identity theft to criminal authorities, and the fact that the FBI may decline to investigate identity theft cases due to lack of resources. In fact, less than one in 32 victims of identity theft file an official complaint on the issue.

Because of these issues, Hoofnagle argues that identity theft information should be gathered from financial institutions. Financial institutions are a central actor during identity theft crimes as they are the institution that imposters use to steal money, they undergo nonpayment after imposters steal money, and they recharge victims after nonpayment. Thus, financial institutions have the most interaction with the imposter, which makes them the best player to gather information about identity theft, according to Hoofnagle. Hoofnagle believes that financial institutions should be required to track the number of identity theft instances that taken place or been avoided, identify the targeted product of the thief, and report the loss suffered or avoided. He argues that these policies will garner more information regarding identity theft, helping institutions avoid the problem in the future.

Hoofnagle's research also discovered that larger institutions that focused on credit card accounts had relatively higher rates of identity fraud than smaller institutions. He argues that this may contradict consumer expectations, as consumers may believe that larger institutions have the tools necessary to avoid identity fraud problems.

=== Consumer privacy ===
==== Social networking services ====
Although signing up for social networking services (SNSs) like Instagram and Facebook do not cost any money to access, Hoofnagle argues that there is a great price for this transaction: the collection of personal information. As consumers post more on SNSs, the SNSs gather more and more personal information on the consumer. Data can be collected directly by tracking the smartphone owner's posts or storing information from other phone applications on the device. It can also be collected indirectly from information that other people store about the smartphone owner on their own devices. Hoofnagle argues that this transaction represents a loss of privacy for consumers. By freely revealing personal information, consumers leave themselves more vulnerable to data collection, identity theft, fraud, and stalking.

Additionally, consumers do not know how their information will be used in the future. It is almost impossible to delete information that has been posted on SNSs, and consumers do not know how that information will be dealt with.

==== Internet tracking ====
There are many methods of internet tracking, including Flash cookies, ETags, HTML5 local storage, Evercookies, and browser fingerprinting. In a study, Hoofnagle discovered that there was a dramatic increase in the use of standard cookies between 2009 and 2011. Additionally, most cookies were placed by third-party hosts, which is mainly made up of advertisers.

Hoofnagle argues that modern privacy regulation would give consumers more choices in the marketplace. He denies that government intervention of this kind is paternalistic in nature.

==== Commercial data brokers ====
Commercial data brokers (CDBs) are businesses that collect personal information on individuals and sell it. Hoofnagle argues that CDBs like ChoicePoint perform law enforcement duties by allowing the police to download collections of information about individuals. He thinks that CDBs should be regulated by the Privacy Act of 1974 as a result. He argues that government access to CDBs gives law enforcement information that they would not be able to collect legally, presenting a significant legal issue.

Hoofnagle presents three policy solutions to protect personal data from law enforcement. He believes that commercial and government collection of information shouldn't be distinct, public records should be compatible with modern technology, and the Privacy Act of 1974 should apply to CDBs.

==== Physical vs digital goods ====
In "What We Buy When We Buy Now," authors Aaron Perzanowski and Chris Hoofnagle explore a common misconception regarding consumer rights when buying digital goods; specifically, the misconception that the same regulations govern physical and digital media. The authors called their study The Mediashop Study. After conducting a web-based survey, they discovered that most consumers believe that digital goods and physical goods have the same rights to use and transfer. For example, just like an individual can easily transfer a physical book to someone, most consumers believe they have this same ability with digital books. This is not the case under current digital ownership rights. The study also revealed that consumers would be willing to pay more for the right to transfer digital goods and that adding a short notice that explains consumers’ digital rights would be effective in reducing consumer misperceptions.

==== Privacy policies ====
Hoofnagle argues that there are limitations to the FTC's privacy policy approach. The Federal Trade Commission (FTC) is the primary consumer protection agency in the United States. Despite the FTC's commitment to the self-regulation of privacy, Hoofnagle argues that consumers are very concerned about their private information being collected. In "The Federal Trade Commission and Consumer Privacy in the Coming Decade," Hoofnagle and the other authors explain how most Americans believe that a company's privacy policy explains how their information will remain private. However, in reality, privacy policies merely detail how website will use a consumer's private information. Based on their research, the authors conclude that privacy notices alone are insufficient for consumer privacy. To advance privacy, the authors suggest that the FTC make three provisions: police the term “privacy policy,” consult with experts in usability to create privacy-protecting mechanisms, and set benchmarks for self-regulation.

=== Privacy law ===
==== Europe ====
The European Union's General Data Protection Regulation (GDPR) is the E.U.'s law on data protection. Hoofnagle argues that the GDPR is "the most consequential regulatory development in information policy in a generation." The GDPR applies to situations where "personal data" is "processed," so virtually all actions involving personal data are protected under the GDPR. The GDPR also places significant burden on data controllers (e.g. companies) to ensure the privacy of consumer information. For instance, they must keep records of all their data processing, adopt a data protection policy, and be transparent on their data usage. Exemptions to the regulations of the GDPR are data activity of personal use or national security. Consequences for breaking the rules of the GDPR include sanctions and fines, and Data Protection Authorities are the main enforcers of the GDPR's regulations.

==== The United States ====
The U.S.'s Privacy Act of 1974 and Fair Credit Reporting Act of 1970 (FCRA) are the framework for U.S. privacy law. Hoofnagle argues that these regulations don't adequately protect privacy, as many companies have found loopholes to them. He argues that the problem with the Privacy Act is that it only applies to the federal government and private companies that work for the government. It does not apply to other private companies or data brokers. Hoofnagle additionally criticizes the FCRA for solely applying to "consumer reporting agencies" that use "consumer reports." Consumer reports solely concern communication on a consumer relating to credit evaluation, employment screening, insurance underwriting, or licensing, and all other uses are not protected by the FCRA.

Hoofnagle and Daniel Solove propose a series of regulations that they label as "The Model Regime" as solutions to the problems they propose with U.S. privacy law. These solutions include:

1. Universal notice of when companies collect individuals’ private information
2. Meaningful consent of consumers when data is collected
3. Meaningful exercise of consumers’ rights,
4. Effective individual management of consumer reporting
5. Accessing personal information that companies store
6. Greater security of information
7. Disclosing security breaches
8. Limiting use of social security numbers
9. Regulating access to public records
10. Limiting use of background checks
11. Regulating private investigators
12. Limiting government access to business and financial records
13. Regulating government data mining
14. Updating the Privacy Act
15. Effectively enforcing privacy rights

==== Europe and U.S. compared ====
One key divergence between the United States and Europe with regard to privacy is how privacy is discussed legally. In the U.S., conceptions of privacy are broadly categorized as "privacy" or "information privacy" issues. On the other hand, European law distinguishes between information privacy and data protection. While data protection ensures the due process of data, privacy refers to the right to a private life (e.g. private family life and private home).

Additionally, while the GDPR places the burden of the privacy of consumer information on data controllers, U.S. privacy law places this burden on data subjects. This means that in the U.S., consumers are responsible for reading privacy notices and determining for themselves whether they feel like their private information will be protected.

=== New transaction systems ===
In 2013, Hoofnagle conducted an experiment along with Jennifer Urban and Su Li regarding American opinion towards privacy in new transaction systems (e.g. mobile payment systems). An advantage of mobile payment systems is that they serve as a digital wallet, allowing consumers the convenience of making transactions online. They also have the potential for better payment security. However, a privacy concern that Hoofnagle and the authors identify is that this new technology allows merchants to collect personally-identifiable contact information regarding consumers, a feature that is not provided in a typical credit card transactions. The authors' research suggested that Americans are opposed to systems that track them when they browse stores and share their information after purchases (e.g. sharing their phone number).

=== Cybercrime ===
In "Deterring Cybercrime: Focus on Intermediaries,” authors Aniket Kesari, Chris Hoofnagle, and Damon McCoy prove how intermediaries can limit cybercrime. According to the authors, cybercriminals rely on many intermediaries to commit illegal acts. These include methods of acquiring new customers, web hosting, collecting payments, and the delivery of products. While most of the legal scholarship on cybercrime grants intermediaries’ general immunity from the illegal acts of users, the authors argue that intermediaries should be required to take action against criminal activities of users. The authors list examples of current methods to force intermediaries to take action. An example of a government-led intervention includes domain name seizures. This is authorized by the PRO-IP Act, giving the federal government the authority to seize a website accused of illegal activity. An example of private companies limiting the harm of cybercriminals includes the eBay Verified Rights Online (VeRO) Program. This program prevents sellers from illegally marketing and selling items.

=== The tethered economy ===
In "The Tethered Economy" by Chris Hoofnagle, Aniket Kesari, and Aaron Perzanowski, the authors refer to tethering as the connection and dependence of goods on sellers for their operation. Examples of tethered devices include Google Home, Amazon Alexa, smart kitchen appliances, and other Internet of things devices. All of these items depend on consumers for their functionality. The benefits of tethering are that tethered products increase trade generativity, may be safer to use, and have the potential for new and personalized functions over time. One harm of tethering includes the fact that manufacturers decide the durability of products through bricking, feature reduction, altering the terms of the bargain. Tethering also presents information risks, since devices are constantly collecting information on consumer behavior. Lastly, tethering reduces choice and competition in the market, raising switching costs that may lock consumers into particular devices or platforms. For example, it may be hard to switch to Microsoft devices once a consumer already owns many Apple devices.

The authors present legal interventions that can change the relationship between sellers and buyers and address the tethering of the economy. Contracts, tort law, and antitrust and consumer protection laws are all suggested reforms to address consumer problems that arise from tethering; however, the authors argue that no single approach will solve all of the problems discussed in the article.

== See also ==
- Information privacy
- Identity theft
- Identity fraud
- Privacy law
- Privacy law in the United States
- Consumer privacy
