= Francis Wallace (writer) =

American screenwriter

- Born: Francis John Wallace; 12 February 1894; Bellaire, Ohio
- Died: 19 August 1977 (aged 83); Cocoa Beach, Florida
- Resting place: Mt. Calvary Cemetery in Bellaire, Ohio
- Education: St. John Central Grade School, Bellaire; St. John Central High School, Bellaire
- Alma mater: University of Notre Dame
- Occupations: sportswriter, author, screenwriter, commentator (radio & television)
- Spouse: Mary Heath (1902–1992)
- Children: John Francis Wallace
- Relatives: Father: John Simon Wallace (1848–1917); Mother: Mary Griffin Wallace (1856–1932)
- Writing career
- Language: English
- Genre: sports

Francis Wallace (February 12, 1894 – August 19, 1977) was an American sportswriter, fiction writer, screenwriter, and commentator for both radio and television broadcasts. His papers are housed in the Francis Wallace Collection, University of Notre Dame Archives.

== Personal life ==
Francis Wallace was born in Bellaire, Ohio on February 12, 1894, to John Simon Wallace (1848–1917) and Mary Griffin Wallace (1856–1932) who emigrated from Ireland to the United States in the 1870s. Wallace attended St. John Central Grade School and St. John Central High School, both in Bellaire. After graduation, Wallace reportedly worked in area railroad shops, glass factories, and steel mills for approximately seven years. He enlisted as a naval aviator but the armistice bringing World War I to an end was signed before he was deployed.

In 1919, his siblings collectively recognized Wallace's talents, pooled their resources, and helped to send him off to college at the University of Notre Dame. While at Notre Dame, Wallace studied philosophy. Perhaps the greatest influence in Wallace's education, however, came while serving as a press intern for Knute Rockne. Wallace thus traveled with the team and worked with the legendary coach to package stories for the press. He graduated from Notre Dame in 1923.

Wallace married Mary Heath (1902–1992) of Bellaire, Ohio in 1925, and their only child, John Francis Wallace was born in New York City in 1932. While Francis and Mary Wallace would also establish residences in Beverly Hills, California and in the Miami, Florida area over the course of their lives, they returned to Bellaire in the late-1930s and, in many ways, always considered it home. Mary served as a teacher and principal at St. John's Central. Francis had a home office and even dabbled in politics—running as a Republican candidate for the United States House of Representatives from his home district in Ohio. He lost but claims to have received the "intelligent vote".

Wallace died in Cocoa Beach, Florida on August 19, 1977. He and Mary are buried next to each other in the Mt. Calvary Cemetery in Bellaire, Ohio.

== Professional life ==
After graduating from Notre Dame, Francis Wallace accepted a position as a night city editor for the Associated Press. He then served as a sportswriter for the New York Post and the New York Daily News. During that time, he authored the story detailing Knute Rockne's "Win One for the Gipper" speech and popularized the Fighting Irish among the press in the Northeast as the mascot for the University of Notre Dame. He was also one of the earliest voices for the reform of college football.

In 1927, he began writing fiction and non-fiction stories for a number of magazines. His first of seventeen books, Huddle!, was published in 1930 by Farrar & Rinehart. Several of those stories and books became the basis for motion picture screen plays. His first of seven motion pictures, Touchdown, was released by Paramount Pictures in 1931. Kid Galahad was released by Warner Bros. in 1937, and was remade by the Mirisch Company in 1962.

In 1937, Wallace launched what would become an industry with the release of an annual college football preview. Between 1937 and 1948, Wallace's predictions ran in The Saturday Evening Post under the title Pigskin Preview. From 1949 to 1956, Wallace's predictions ran in Collier's under the title Annual Football Preview. After Collier's ceased publication, Wallace's predictions ran in Playboy and returned to the title of Pigskin Preview. After learning that Playboy also published "pornographic" photos as part of its content, Wallace terminated the agreement he had struck with Hugh Hefner. By that time, the industry Wallace inspired was in full-swing as many other football predictions were on the market.

Wallace's prominence as a sportswriter led him to serve as a commentator for the CBS TV network and the ABC radio network. Toward the end of his career, however, he labored in a number of ways on behalf of his beloved alma mater. For example, he was elected as president of Notre Dame's alumni association in 1949. His last three books were all non-fiction works that focused on various aspects of the university's history and culture. He served on the Library Council and served as the inaugural chair of the Sports and Games Collection (now known as the Joyce Sports Research Collection). Mary Wallace also served on the Women's Advisory Council for the university.

== Work ==
=== Books ===
Books by Wallace:

- Huddle! (Farrar & Rinehart, 1930)
- O’Reilly of Notre Dame (Farrar & Rinehart, 1931)
- Stadium (Farrar & Rinehart, 1931)
- That’s My Boy (Farrar & Rinehart, 1932)
- Big Game (Little, Brown and Company, 1936)
- Kid Galahad (Grosset & Dunlap, 1936)
- Autumn Madness (Books, Inc., 1937)
- Razzle-dazzle (Grosset & Dunlap, 1938)
- Little Hercules (M. S. Mill Co., Inc., 1939)
- Explosion (William Morrow and Company, 1943)
- The Notre Dame Story (Rinehart & Company, 1949)
- Big League Rookie (Westminster Press, 1948)
- Dimentia Pigskin (Rinehart & Company, 1951)
- Front Man (Rinehart & Company, 1952)
- Knute Rockne (Doubleday, 1960)
- Notre Dame: From Rockne to Parseghian (David McKay Publications, 1965)
- Notre Dame: Its People and Its Legends (David McKay Publications, 1969)

=== Movies ===
- Touchdown (Paramount Pictures, 1931)
- Huddle (Metro-Goldwyn-Mayer, 1932)
- That’s My Boy (Columbia Pictures, 1932)
- The Big Game (RKO Pictures, 1936)
- Rose Bowl, (Paramount Pictures, 1936)
- Kid Galahad (Warner Bros., 1937)
- The Wagons Roll at Night (Warner Bros., 1941)
- Kid Galahad (Mirisch Company, 1962)

=== Pigskin Preview Issues ===
- Saturday Evening Post, 9/25/1937
- Saturday Evening Post, 9/24/1938
- Saturday Evening Post, 9/25/1939
- Saturday Evening Post, 9/21/1940
- Saturday Evening Post, 9/20/1941
- Saturday Evening Post, 9/19/1942
- No Issue in 1943, 1944, 1945 Due to World War II
- Saturday Evening Post, 9/21/1946
- Saturday Evening Post, 9/13/1947
- Saturday Evening Post, 9/18/1948

=== Annual Football Preview Issues ===
- Collier's, 9/24/1949
- Collier's, 9/16/1950
- Collier's, 9/15/1951
- Collier's, 8/30/1952
- Collier's, 9/18/1953
- Collier's, 9/17/1954
- Collier's, 9/16/1955
- Collier's, 9/14/1956

=== Pigskin Preview Issue ===
- Playboy, September 1957
