= John Buddenberg =

American gridiron football player (born 1965)

No. 72, 64, 62
- Position: Offensive lineman

Personal information
- Born: October 9, 1965 (age 61); Wheeling, West Virginia, U.S.
- Listed height: 6 ft 6 in (1.98 m)
- Listed weight: 270 lb (122 kg)

Career information
- High school: Bellaire (OH)
- College: Akron
- NFL draft: 1989: 10th round, 274th overall pick

Career history
- Cleveland Browns (1989)*; Minnesota Vikings (1989)*; Pittsburgh Steelers (1990)*; Sacramento Surge (1991-1992); Atlanta Falcons (1991-1992)*; Sacramento Gold Miners/San Antonio Texans (1994-1995)
- * Offseason or practice squad member only

Awards and highlights
- All-WLAF (1992)

Career CFL statistics
- Games played: 35

John Edward Buddenberg Jr. (born October 9, 1965) is an American former professional football offensive lineman who played two seasons in the Canadian Football League (CFL). From 1989 to 1992 he was on NFL practice squad rosters and from 1991 to 1992 he was a player in WLAF.

== Early life and education ==
Buddenberg was born on October 9, 1965, in Wheeling, West Virginia. He attended Bellaire High School in Ohio and the University of Akron.

== Professional career ==
=== NFL ===
Buddenberg was drafted in the tenth round (274th overall) of the 1989 NFL draft by the Cleveland Browns. He spent time on the practice squads of the Browns (1989), Minnesota Vikings (1989), Pittsburgh Steelers (1990), and Atlanta Falcons (1991–1992) but he did not play in a single game.

=== WLAF ===
In the offseasons of 1991 and 1992, he played in the WLAF for the Sacramento Surge. He was named All-WLAF in 1992.

=== CFL ===
From 1994 to 1995, Buddenberg played for the Sacramento Gold Miners/San Antonio Texans of the Canadian Football League. He played in 35 games for them.
