= Bull Polisky =

American football player (1901–1978)

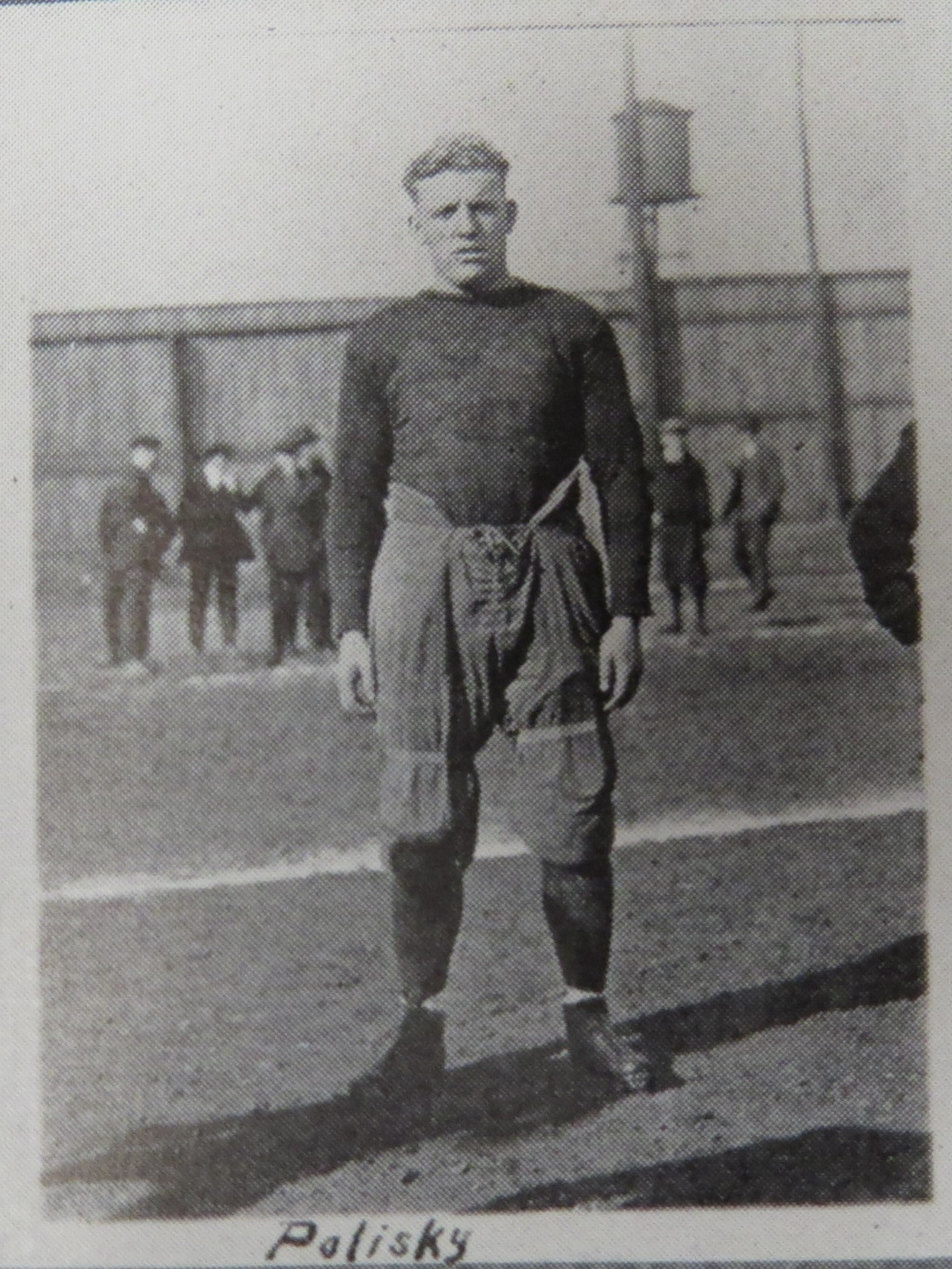
- Polinsky while at Bellaire High School

No. 27
- Positions: Guard, tackle

Personal information
- Born: January 15, 1901; Pittsburgh, Pennsylvania, U.S.
- Died: April 23, 1978 (aged 77); Wellsville, Ohio, U.S.
- Listed height: 6 ft 0 in (1.83 m)
- Listed weight: 225 lb (102 kg)

Career information
- High school: Bellaire (Bellaire, Ohio)
- College: St. Edward's (1924); Notre Dame (1925–1927)

Career history
- Chicago Bears (1929)
- Stats at Pro Football Reference

John "Bull" Polisky (January 15, 1901 – April 23, 1978) was an American professional football player who played one season with the Chicago Bears of the National Football League (NFL). He played college football at St. Edward's College and the University of Notre Dame.

== Early life and college ==
John Polisky was born on January 15, 1901, in Pittsburgh, Pennsylvania. He attended Bellaire High School in Bellaire, Ohio.

Polisky was a member of the St. Edward's Saints of St. Edward's College in 1924. He was then a three-year letterman for the Notre Dame Fighting Irish of the University of Notre Dame from 1925 to 1927. He was also an outfielder on the Notre Dame Fighting Irish baseball team from 1926 to 1927.

== Professional career ==
Polisky signed with the Chicago Bears of the National Football League in 1929. He played in nine games, starting six, for the Bears during the 1929 season. He became a free agent after the season.

== Death ==
Polisky died on April 23, 1978, in Wellsville, Ohio.
