= Mike Basrak =

American football player (1912–1973)

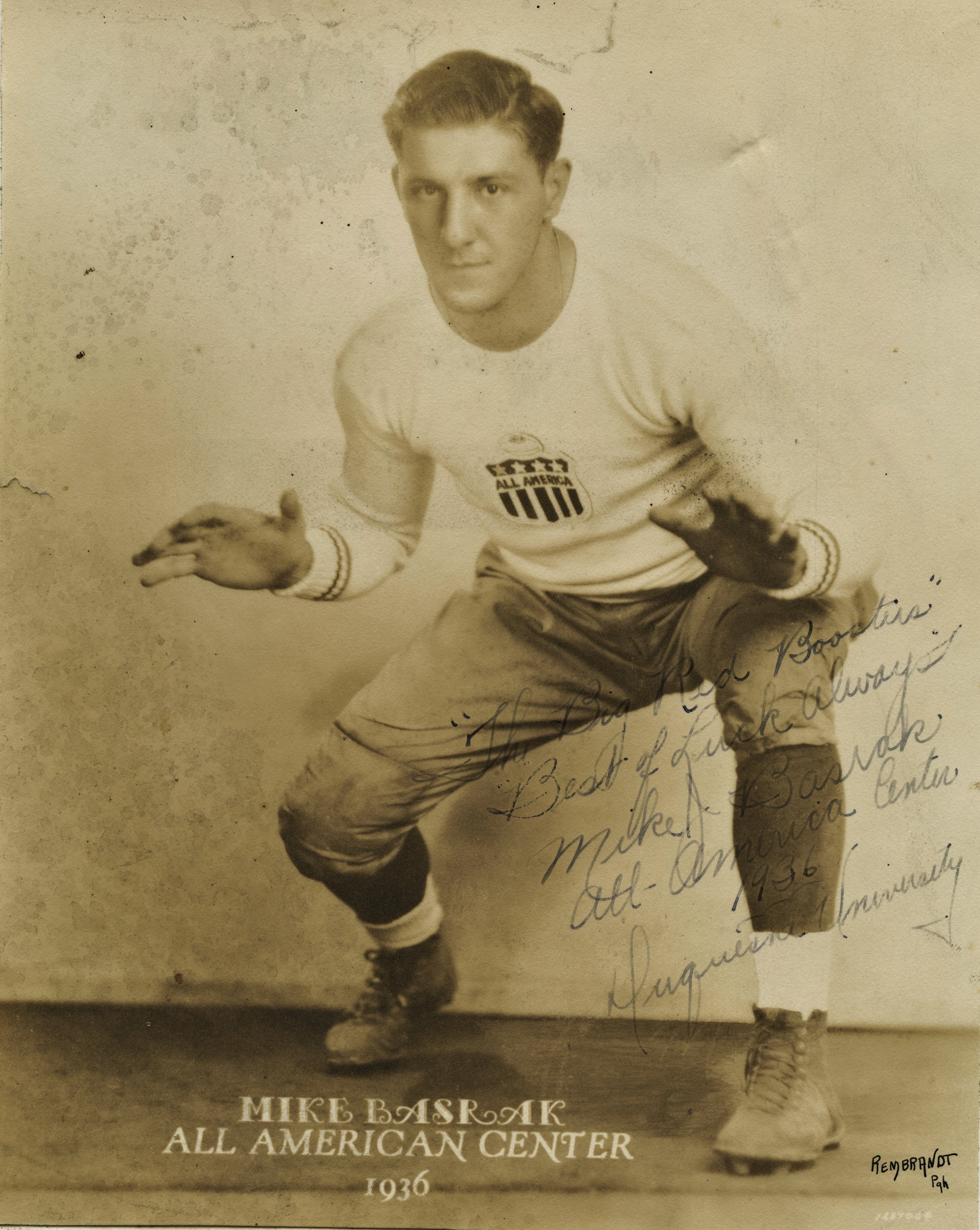

No. 11
- Position: Center

Personal information
- Born: November 23, 1912; Bellaire, Ohio, U.S.
- Died: April 4, 2002 (aged 54); Skokie, Illinois, U.S.
- Listed height: 6 ft 2 in (1.88 m)
- Listed weight: 220 lb (100 kg)

Career information
- High school: Bellaire
- College: Duquesne (1933-1936)
- NFL draft: 1937: 1st round, 5th overall pick

Career history
- Pittsburgh Pirates (1937–1938)

Awards and highlights
- First-team All-Pro (1937); Second-team All-Pro (1938); Consensus All-American (1936); First-team All-Eastern (1936); Orange Bowl MVP (1937)

Career NFL statistics
- Games played: 15
- Games started: 15
- Stats at Pro Football Reference

Michael J. Basrak (November 23, 1912 – December 18, 1973) was an American professional football player for the Pittsburgh Pirates of the National Football League (NFL). He played college football for the Duquesne Dukes, earning consensus All-American honors in 1936. The school's first All-American selection, he was the Most Valuable Player of the 1937 Orange Bowl game in Miami, in which Duquesne defeated Mississippi State University, 13–12. Later in the year, Basrak was selected by Pirates (later known as the Steelers) in the first round of the 1937 NFL draft with the fifth overall pick. Pittsburgh Pirates. However, Basrak only played two seasons in the NFL, retiring after the 1938 season. He played his high school football at Bellaire.

Basrak was an officer in the United States Navy during the Second World War. In later life Basrak served as football coach at Niles East High School (1954–62) and then Niles West High School (1963–73), both in Skokie, Illinois, a suburb north of Chicago.

Basrak died at home in Skokie on December 18, 1973, aged 61. After his death, the Niles West football field was named Mike Basrak Field in his honor. He was posthumously inducted into the Bellaire High School Hall of Fame.
