= Aaron Perzanowski =

American legal scholar

Aaron Perzanowski is an American legal scholar and the Thomas W. Lacchia Professor of Law at the University of Michigan Law School. His research focuses on intellectual property law, with a particular emphasis on consumer ownership of digital goods, the right to repair, and informal creative norms.

== Early life and education ==
Perzanowski was born in Wheeling, West Virginia, and raised in nearby Bellaire, Ohio. He has a BA in philosophy from Kenyon College and earned a JD from the University of California, Berkeley School of Law.

== Career ==
Perzanowski was an intellectual property litigator at Fenwick & West in San Francisco, California. In 2008, he joined the Berkeley Center for Law & Technology as the Microsoft Research Fellow. He has taught at Wayne State University Law School, Notre Dame Law School, and Case Western Reserve University School of Law, where he was named the John Homer Kapp Professor of Law. He joined the Michigan Law faculty in 2022.

== Research ==
Perzanowski writes primarily about intellectual property law, with a focus on copyright.

=== Digital Ownership ===
Much of his work addresses the question of ownership in a digital economy. He co-authored a series of law review articles with Jason Schultz that examined the application of copyright’s first sale doctrine to digital media and embedded software, arguing that consumers should enjoy the right to alienate digital assets in much the same way they can resell or otherwise dispose of tangible goods. In 2016, MIT Press published their book The End of Ownership: Personal Property in the Digital Economy, which argues for preserving consumer property rights in the face of the transition to a digital media environment.

With Chris Jay Hoofnagle, Perzanowski devised an experiment to measure consumer expectations of ownership with respect to digital goods by creating a fictitious online retail site offering both physical and digital entertainment goods. They discovered that consumers often believe that digital goods and physical goods feature the same rights to use and transfer, despite license terms that restrict digital assets. However, they found that prominent short notices can correct consumer misperceptions. They argue that the use of terms like “buy” and “purchase” misleads consumers and should be considered false advertising.

Perzanowski, Hoofnagle, and Aniket Kesari explored product tethering—the use of software and network connectivity to enable post-sale manufacturer control over consumer goods. This practice enables manufacturers to limit device functionality or even brick products, altering the terms of the initial bargain. Tethering also presents information risks because devices collect and share information on consumer behavior. It also reduces choice and competition in the market by raising switching costs and encouraging consumer lock-in.

Perzanowski is a leading expert on the right to repair. He has published a number of law review articles on the topic. His 2022 book, The Right to Repair: Reclaiming the Things We Own, was published by Cambridge University Press and offers “a comprehensive and accessible account” of the ways in which manufacturers of consumer goods, industrial equipment, and other goods rely on product design, legal restrictions, and marketplace strategies to prevent owners from fixing the products they buy.

=== Informal creative norms ===
His research also explores how creative communities rely on informal social norms, rather than formal law, to govern practices, expectations, and disputes over the creation and use of expressive works. He has written extensively about the role such norms play in the tattoo industry, where tattooers discourage close copying of custom artwork but accept the widespread use of flash designs and commercial art. With Dave Fagundes, he has described the use of clown eggs as an informal system for recording clowns' makeup designs to discourage copying. Perzanowski and Kate Darling edited the book Creativity Without Law: Challenging the Assumptions of Intellectual Property (NYU Press, 2017), which collects a range of examples of creative communities that use social norms and market strategies as substitutes for formal intellectual property protection.

=== Other work ===
Perzanowski has written on a range of other topics in intellectual property law, including the RAM copy doctrine, the scope of the Copyright Office's expertise, the contours of copyright abandonment with Dave Fagundes, and the use of popular music by political campaigns with Jake Linford.
