= Kid Galahad (1937 film) =

1937 film by Michael Curtiz

- Theatrical release poster
- Directed by: Michael Curtiz
- Screenplay by: Seton I. Miller
- Based on: Saturday Evening Post; 1936 story by Francis Wallace
- Produced by: Samuel Bischoff; Hal B. Wallis; Jack L. Warner
- Starring: Edward G. Robinson; Bette Davis; Humphrey Bogart
- Cinematography: Tony Gaudio
- Edited by: George Amy
- Music by: Heinz Roemheld; Max Steiner
- Production company: Warner Bros. Pictures
- Distributed by: Warner Bros. Pictures
- Release date: May 26, 1937 (premiere)
- Running time: 102 minutes
- Country: United States
- Language: English

Kid Galahad is a 1937 American sports drama film directed by Michael Curtiz and starring Edward G. Robinson, Bette Davis, Humphrey Bogart and, in the title role, rising newcomer Wayne Morris. A boxing film, it was scripted by Seton I. Miller and distributed by Warner Bros. Pictures. It was remade in 1941, this time in a circus setting, as The Wagons Roll at Night, also with Bogart, and in 1962 as an Elvis Presley musical. The original version was re-titled The Battling Bellhop for television distribution in order to avoid confusion with the Presley remake.

== Plot ==
In Florida, boxing promoter Nick Donati gets double-crossed by his boxer, who throws a fight for a $25,000 bribe from gangster Turkey Morgan. Nick and his girlfriend "Fluff" decide to throw a wild, days-long party with the money they have left, before looking for a new boxing prospect. Nick orders naive young farmer turned hotel bellhop, Ward Guisenberry, to mix some drinks, but he does not know how, as he does not drink. Fluff kindly helps him out. When Morgan, underling Buzz Barret, and Chuck McGraw, his fighter and new heavyweight champion, arrive uninvited, Ward does not like it when the somewhat drunk McGraw pushes Fluff, so he punches him, knocking him to the ground. Nick is impressed, and persuades him to try boxing.

For his first bout, Ward is up against McGraw's experienced brother. Much to everyone's surprise, he wins by knockout. To protect him from Morgan's wrath, Nick sends him, Fluff and ringside assistant Silver Jackson to New York City by train. However, Morgan is waiting outside their usual hotel. He tries to get Ward to sign with him, but Ward knocks him down, insisting he will only sign with Nick.

Desperate, Fluff decides to hide Ward at Nick's mother's farm. There, he meets Nick's sister, Marie, fresh from a convent education. They clash. When Nick finds out, he is furious. He does not want his family to have anything to do with boxing. He takes Ward back to the city.

Ward, rechristened "Kid Galahad", wins a string of fights by knockout. He tells Fluff that his goal is to earn enough to buy a farm. Fluff falls for him, and is crushed when he confides to her that he is in love with Marie. She hides her disappointment, and with her encouragement, he drives up to tell Marie. It turns out that she is just as much in love with him. Fluff leaves Nick, confessing to him that she loves Ward and cannot bear to be around him. She gets a job singing in a nightclub.

In Ward's next fight, Nick orders him to just box and win on points, as knocking his opponent out would build public pressure to fight the champ too soon; Nick wants more time to train his fighter. However, Morgan tells his foe what to say to infuriate Ward. As a result, Ward wins by knockout.

Marie sees the fight; afterward they go out on the town. When she asks to see Fluff, Ward takes her to the nightclub. By coincidence, McGraw is in a private room there, drunk and with a couple of girls. When Morgan shows up to get him, McGraw spots Ward and pushes him to the floor. The two are separated, but Ward offers to fight within the month. Newspaper photographers take pictures of Ward with both Marie and Fluff. As a result, Nick finally learns that Ward has been seeing his sister.

Infuriated, Nick secretly turns on his boxer, agreeing to a title bout. He orders Ward to come out slugging, knowing it is a losing strategy. When Morgan discovers that Nick has placed substantial bets against his own fighter, he visits Nick. He learns that Nick wants to get back at Ward, and decides to bet $150,000 himself. During the bout, Ward faithfully follows Nick's orders and is knocked down repeatedly by McGraw. Fluff and Marie attend the fight together. When Fluff realizes what Nick is doing, she and Marie plead with him to stop. Nick finally comes to his senses and changes tactics. In the end, Ward knocks McGraw out and becomes world heavyweight champion.

After the fight, an armed Morgan arranges to be alone in the changing room with Nick, Ward and Silver. Nick is prepared though, and also has a gun. They exchange shots, fatal on both sides. Before he dies, Nick gives his blessing to Ward and Marie.

== Cast ==
- Edward G. Robinson as Nick Donati
- Bette Davis as Louise "Fluff" Phillips
- Humphrey Bogart as Turkey Morgan
- Wayne Morris as Ward Guisenberry "Kid Galahad"
- Jane Bryan as Marie Donati
- Harry Carey as Silver Jackson
- William Haade as Chuck McGraw
- Soledad Jiménez as Mrs. Donati
- Joe Cunningham as Joe Taylor, a reporter
- Ben Welden as Buzz Barett
- Joseph Crehan as Brady
- Veda Ann Borg as The Redhead
- Frank Faylen as Barney
- Harland Tucker as Gunman
- Bob Evans as Sam
- Hank Hankinson as Burke
- Bob Nestell as O'Brien
- Jack Kranz as Denbaugh
- George Blake as Referee

== Production ==
According to his New York Times obituary of December 3, 1975, the playwright and screenwriter Lawrence Riley, famous for his Broadway hit Personal Appearance (basis of Mae West's Go West, Young Man), contributed to Kid Galahad's screenplay, but was uncredited.

Edward G. Robinson and Humphrey Bogart made five films together: Bullets or Ballots (1936), Kid Galahad (1937), The Amazing Dr. Clitterhouse (1938), Brother Orchid (1940) and Key Largo (1948) with Lauren Bacall, Claire Trevor and Lionel Barrymore.

== Reception ==
The New York Times reviewer Frank S. Nugent applauded Morris's "natural and easy performance. Time Out considered the movie a "none too subtle exposition of the now well-worn theme of corruption in the boxing-ring", but conceded that "sleek direction and excellent performances keep it enjoyable." Dave Kehr of the Chicago Reader disagreed, characterizing it as "pretty much all genre and no nuance", but he found Curtiz's direction "surprising soft and light."

== See also ==
- List of boxing films
