= Imperial Glass Company =

- U.S. National Register of Historic Places
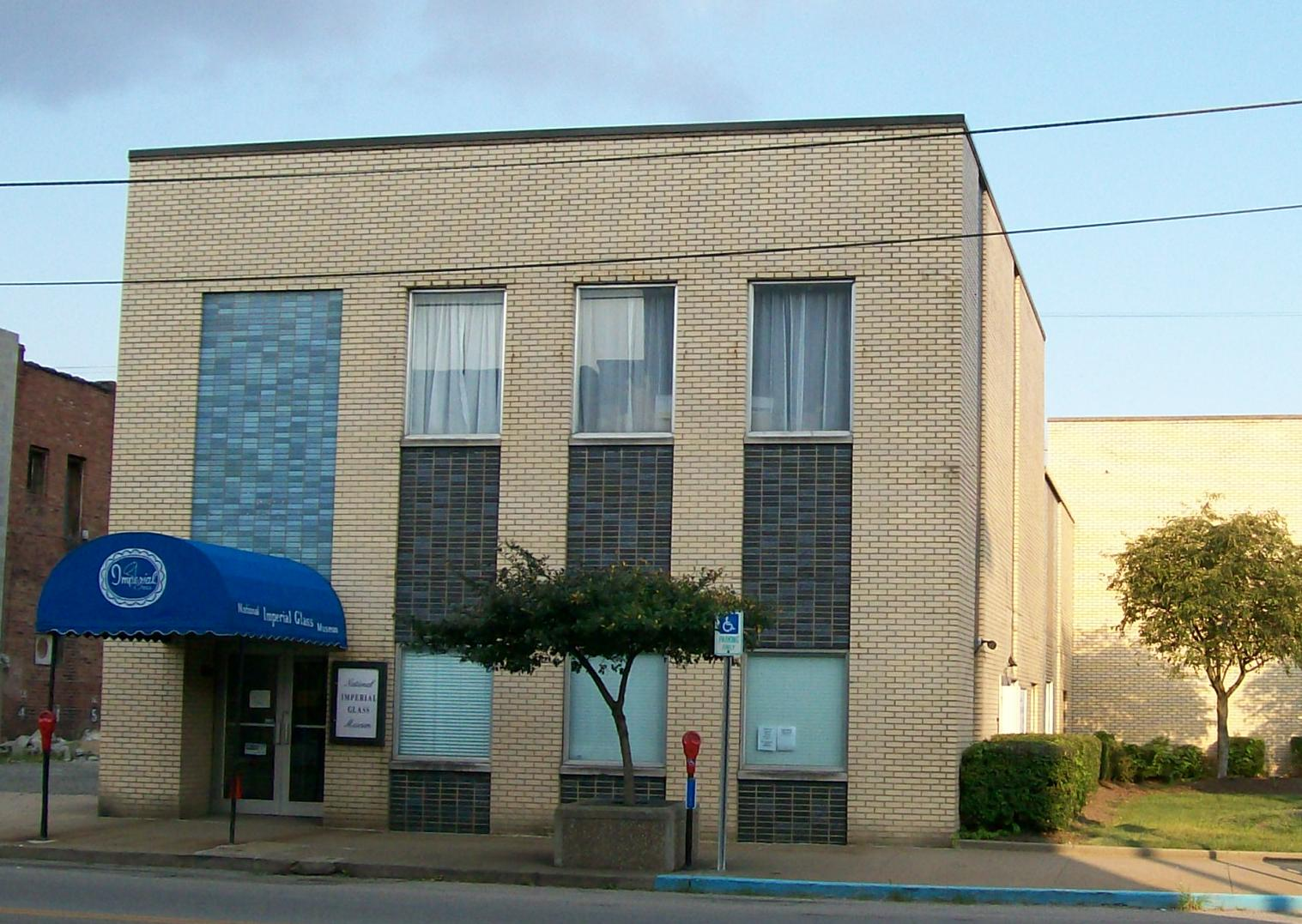
- The Imperial Glass Museum in Bellaire, Ohio

- Location within Ohio Location within the United States
- Location: 29th and Belmont Sts., Bellaire, Ohio
- Coordinates: 40°0′41″N 80°44′49″W
- Built: 1903
- Architect: Forney, Harry E.
- NRHP reference No.: 83001945
- Added to NRHP: September 08, 1983

The Imperial Glass Company is located in Bellaire, Ohio, with a factory located on 29th Street and the offices located on Belmont Street. The factory was razed in 1995 to make room for commercial development and the Belmont Street location was transformed into a museum known as the National Imperial Glass Museum. The building was placed on the National Register on 1983-09-08.

== History ==
The Imperial Glass Company was founded in 1901 by Edward Muhleman, with production beginning in 1904. The handmade glasswares were sold worldwide and were usually made of pressed glass patterns. The factory located at 29th Street was labeled as one of the largest glass factories under one roof. The company's most famous product is their "Candlewick" series, which even has a street named for it in Bellaire.

The company hit rough times in the early 1970s and was close to bankruptcy. Imperial was saved by Lenox and turned to general manufacture, but low demand eventually led to its closure in 1984. The building on Belmont Street was eventually turned into a museum housing many pieces from the company's long run, as well as a history of the company.
