= Lance Mehl =

American football player (born 1958)

No. 56
- Position: Linebacker

Personal information
- Born: February 14, 1958 (age 68); Bellaire, Ohio, U.S.
- Listed height: 6 ft 3 in (1.91 m)
- Listed weight: 235 lb (107 kg)

Career information
- High school: Bellaire
- College: Penn State
- NFL draft: 1980: 3rd round, 69th overall pick

Career history
- New York Jets (1980–1987)

Awards and highlights
- Second-team All-Pro (1985); Pro Bowl (1985); Second-team All-American (1979); 2× First-team All-East (1978, 1979)

Career NFL statistics
- Sacks: 15
- Interceptions: 15
- Fumble recoveries: 5
- Stats at Pro Football Reference

Lance Alan Mehl (born February 14, 1958) is an American former professional football player who was a linebacker for eight seasons with the New York Jets of the National Football League (NFL), from 1980 to 1987. He played college football for the Penn State Nittany Lions, earning All-American honors. Mehl was selected by the Jets in the third round of the 1980 NFL draft with the 69th overall pick. He was named to the Pro Bowl in 1985.

Mehl was the leading tackler for the unbeaten 1978 Nittany Lion team. He earned a Bachelor of Science in Industrial Arts Education from Penn State University in 1980.

Mehl was a three-sport team captain at Bellaire High School in Bellaire, Ohio in football, baseball, and basketball.

Today, Mehl is retired from working to help troubled youth. He is the father of four sons: Lance Jr, Lucas, Logan, and Layne. Lance's mother was Beulah.

According to Lance Mehl's 1984 Topps football card #153, he was the Jets leading interceptor in 1983. He recorded 10 tackles in 44-17 playoff win at Cincinnati Jan 9, 1983. As a bit of "Did You Know" the card said "Lance once worked in the coal mines of Ohio" In 1985, he was selected to play in the Pro Bowl.

Mehl wore the number #56 while playing for the New York Jets.

In 2012, Mehl testified as a character witness on behalf of former coach Jerry Sandusky, calling him, "a class act." However, in a later interview, he said, "no doubt, if coach Sandusky is truly guilty of these crimes, he must be punished...and punished severely." Sandusky was later found guilty of 45 felony charges related to child rape and child endangerment.
