= Kate Darling =

American-Swiss academic (born 1982)

Katherine Irene Maynard Darling
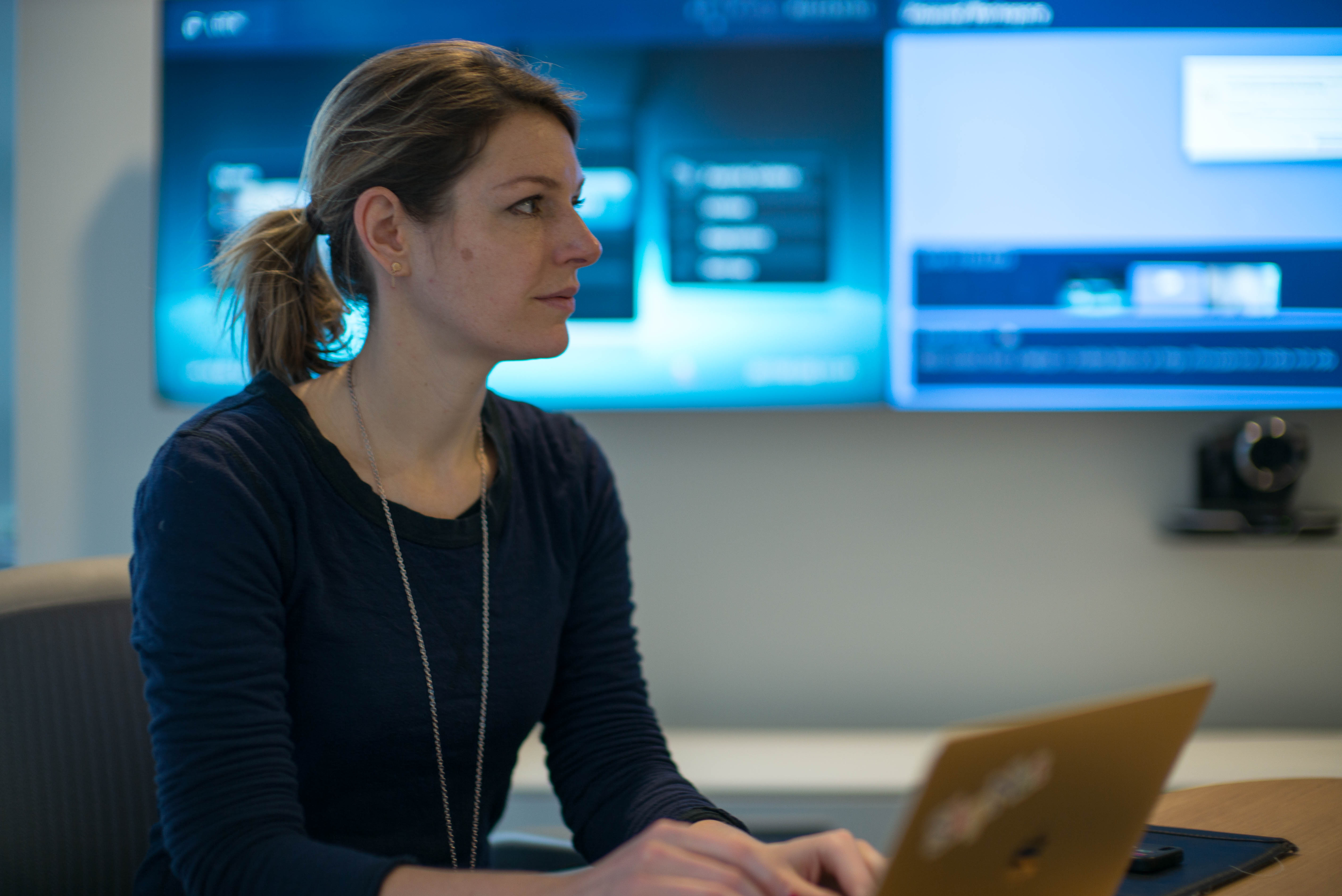
- Darling in 2017
- Born: 1982 (age 43–44)
- Education: ETH Zurich, University of Basel
- Scientific career
- Fields: Law, ethics, technology
- Thesis: Copyright and new technologies: theoretical and empirical analysis of copyright transfers and content production incentives (2014)

Katherine 'Kate' Irene Maynard Darling (January 27, 1982) is an American-Swiss academic. She works on the legal and ethical implications of technology. As of 2019, she is a Research Specialist at the MIT Media Lab.

== Academic career ==
Darling was born in the US, but grew up in Basel, Switzerland. Darling received degrees in Economics and Law from the University of Basel. After completing her 2014 dissertation titled Copyright and new technologies: theoretical and empirical analysis of copyright transfers and content production incentives at ETH Zurich, Darling returned to the US, to teach a robot ethics course at Harvard Law School with Lawrence Lessig. In Darling's robot ethics course, she touches upon how law and robotics work together. However, she primarily focuses on the legal and social issues with robotics. Darling is a former fellow at Harvard Berkman Klein Center for Internet & Society, the Yale Information Society Project and the Center for Law & Economics.

Darling has an honorary doctorate of sciences from Middlebury College. Darling has published academic work on topics such as human-robot interaction and, in her thesis, copyright transfer. In 2017, she received a Mark T Banner Award in Intellectual Property.
