= Bellaire High School (Ohio) =

Location
- 349 35th Street; Bellaire, Ohio 43906; United States
- Coordinates: 40°1′3″N 80°44′32″W

Information
- Type: Public high school
- Motto: Once a Big Red, Always a Big Red!
- Established: 1876
- School district: Bellaire Local School District
- Superintendent: Derrick McAfee
- Principal: Derrick McAfee, Derek Ault
- Teaching staff: 23.50 (FTE)
- Grades: 9–12
- Student to teacher ratio: 12.30
- Colors: Red and Black
- Athletics conference: Buckeye 8 Athletic League; Ohio Valley Athletic Conference
- Team name: Big Reds
- Rival: Martins Ferry Purple Riders
- Newspaper: The Tribunal
- Yearbook: The Beljuan
- Website: www.bellaire.k12.oh.us

Bellaire High School is a public high school located in Bellaire, Ohio, United States. It is the only high school in the Bellaire Local School District. Athletic teams compete as the Bellaire Big Reds in the Ohio High School Athletic Association as a member of the Buckeye 8 Athletic League as well as the Ohio Valley Athletic Conference.

== History ==
The first school in Bellaire was organized in 1876; classes met in the First Ward School Building that also housed a public primary school. The school gained its own building in 1925 at the school's present location.

== Athletics ==
Bellaire is a founding member of the Ohio Valley Athletic Conference (OVAC), joining the conference in 1943. In 2008, they also founded the Buckeye 8 Conference, an affiliate of the OVAC.

== Notable alumni ==
- Mike Basrak – former professional football player in the National Football League (NFL)
- Mac Cara – former professional football player in the National Football League (NFL)
- Nate Davis – former professional football player in the National Football League (NFL)
- Jose Davis – former professional football player
- Andy Dorris – former professional football player in the National Football League (NFL)
- Todd Fitch — college football coach
- Tod Goodwin – former professional football player in the National Football League (NFL)
- Joey Galloway – former professional football player in the National Football League (NFL)
- Ron Lee – former professional football player in the National Football League (NFL)
- Stan Olejniczak – former professional football player and coach in the National Football League (NFL)
- Aaron Perzanowski – legal scholar
- Bull Polisky – former professional football player in the National Football League (NFL)
- Nick Skorich – former professional football player and coach in the National Football League (NFL)
- Lance Mehl – former professional football player in the National Football League (NFL)
- Ben Taylor – former professional football player and coach in the National Football League (NFL)
- Chalmers Tschappat – former professional football player in the National Football League (NFL)
- John Buddenberg – former professional football player in the National Football League (NFL)
- Shag Thomas – former professional wrestler
