= Kid Galahad =

1962 film by Phil Karlson

- Theatrical release poster
- Directed by: Phil Karlson
- Screenplay by: William Fay
- Story by: Francis Wallace
- Produced by: David Weisbart
- Starring: Elvis Presley; Lola Albright; Gig Young; Joan Blackman; Charles Bronson
- Cinematography: Burnett Guffey
- Edited by: Stuart Gilmore
- Music by: Jeff Alexander
- Production company: Mirisch Company
- Distributed by: United Artists
- Release date: August 1, 1962 (Atlanta)
- Running time: 96 minutes
- Country: United States
- Language: English
- Box office: $2.5 million (US/Canada)

Kid Galahad is a 1962 American musical film starring Elvis Presley as a boxer. It was released by United Artists in August 1962 and opened at No. 9 at the American box office. Variety ranked it No. 37 on its list of the top-grossing films of 1962.

Kid Galahad was shot on location in Idyllwild, California. Its supporting cast includes Gig Young, Lola Albright and Charles Bronson. Some critics rate the film as one of Elvis Presley's best performances.

The film is a remake of the 1937 version (in which United Artists Television through Associated Artists Productions distributed for TV airings at that time) starring Edward G. Robinson, Bette Davis and Humphrey Bogart and directed by Michael Curtiz, who also directed the 1958 Presley film King Creole.

== Plot ==
Willy Grogan is a small-time boxing promoter and innkeeper of "Grogan's Gardens" based in the Catskills hills resort region of Cream Valley, in the upper Hudson River Valley of upstate New York. He is a contemptible man who is in debt and pays little attention to the woman who loves him, Dolly, a chain-smoking, love-starved woman residing at the camp.

Young Walter Gulick, arrives, a young man recently discharged from the United States Army and in uniform on the back tailgate of a moving company truck, Walter loves the peaceful setting of the heavily forested village of Cream Valley where he was born years before, almost as much as he loves working on old cars, when a neighboring Prohosko's Garage, where the owner gives him free rein at his repair shop establishment. Walter soon finds occasional work there as a mechanic at the auto garage, plus discovers an old dusty antique Ford Model T sedan car up on blocks under a tarp, which Mr. Prohosko lets him fix up and restore.

When the "Grogan's Gardens" boxing camp owner Willy's younger beautiful raven-haired sister Rose Grogan, shows up unexpectedly on a visit from her office job downstate in New York City. She becomes immediately interested in the handsome young singer / mechanic / amateur boxing student Walter, viewing him amusedly after meeting him, from the veranda porch of the log cabin Grogan Lodge. Willy objects because he doesn't want "little Rose" to fall for a "grease monkey" mechanic and two-bit boxer. His longtime girlfriend and on / off again fiancée Dolly is envious of the young couple's romance and resents her boyfriend Willy's interference.

Walter, in need of work, also accepts a position as a sparring partner for some of the training boxers, especially after he accidentally knocks out one of Willy's top prospective fighters. Willy is persuaded to let Walter, (nicknamed as "Kid Galahad" because of his polite behavior and chivalrous attitude), to try his hand in a real contest bout. Both men are reluctant but need the money. Walter begins training under the watchful experienced eye of Lew Nyack, Willy's top trainer / coach, and Howard Zimmerman, his assistant.

After several successes in the ring, Walter is readied for his biggest fight. Unfortunately some "heavies" gangsters led by Otto Danzig a New York loan-shark and gambler / fight-fixer, criminal gang leader, who want Willy to get Walter to take a dive and lose the bout on purpose so that they can clean up on the gambling betting odds, and Willy can pay off his gambling debts to them. But Walter barges in on the hoods intimidating rousting fight of a visit from Danzig and a couple of his thugs when they attack trainer Lew, breaking his hands / finger bones. So Walter fights, beats up and quickly knocks them all out in the back kitchen when he hears them doing their dirty work and throws his muscle behind Willy to ignore their further attempted intimidation and threats with the help of a visit from Frank Gerson, an assistant district attorney and investigating prosecutor. The fight with Ramon ("Sugar Boy") Romero is hard and difficult but Walter emerges bloodied but victorious. He wins the big fight as well as Willy's approval, retiring undefeated after his short career to his 1920s vintage Ford Model T red car and the heart of his new adoring love Rose.

== Cast ==
- Elvis Presley as young military veteran and auto mechanic / sparring partner / trainee boxer Walter Gulick
- Gig Young as Willy Grogan, boxing camp owner and heavily indebted
- Lola Albright as Dolly Fletcher, Willy Grogan's longtime girlfriend / fiancee
- Joan Blackman as Rose Grogan, Willy Grogan's younger sister, visiting from New York City office
- Charles Bronson as Lew Nyack, trainer / coach at boxing camp
- David Lewis as Otto Danzig, gambler loan-shark, criminal gangster
- Robert Emhardt as Maynard, cook / chef
- Roy Roberts as Jerry Bathgate
- Liam Redmond as Father Higgins, local Roman Catholic parish priest and Irishman, who secretly appreciates boxing bouts
- Judson Pratt as Howard Zimmerman, assistant trainer / coach
- Ned Glass as Max Lieberman
- Ed Asner as Frank Gerson, assistant district attorney (investigator / prosecutor), (uncredited)
- Red West as boxing opponent and student at boxing camp (uncredited)
- Del "Sonny" West in a bit part (uncredited)
- Joe Esposito in a bit part (uncredited), and as a personal friend of Elvis Presley
- Michael Dante as Joie Shakes
- Richard Devon as neighbor Marvin
- Mushy Callahan as Gulick-Romero fight referee
- Orlando De La Fuente** as Ramon "Sugarboy" Romero, boxing bout opponent of Walter Gulick
- George J. Lewis as boxing opponent Ramon "Sugar Boy" Romero's trainer
- Harold ("Tommy") Hart as real-life boxing match referee
- John Gonsalves (Gonzalves) as Presley's stunt double
- Ralph Moody as Peter J. Prohosko, owner of nearby Prohosko's Garage, auto repair shop in Cream Valley and also former owner/driver of stored antique Ford Model T, that Walter repairs / restores and paints bright red
- Chester Morris as man in the crowd
  - (De La Fuente was the real-life reigning welterweight boxing champion at the time of the early 1960s, besides acting / appearing in several other films and TV series)

== Production ==
Former light welterweight world champion Mushy Callahan trained Presley for his role. Callahan, who also appears in the film as a referee, had a long career as a professional boxing referee after retiring from the ring as a fighter. According to Callahan, he threw all of the punches in the close-up scenes in which Presley is struck in the face. He taught Presley how to move his head backward as the punches were being delivered so that each blow either missed him or barely touched him. Callahan considered Presley to be an excellent athlete.

Shooting began in early November 1961 at Hidden Lodge, Idyllwild-Pine Cove-Fern Valley, California, near the higher-altitude forested slopes of the San Jacinto Mountains in Riverside County in far western Southern California, site chosen to resemble the film"s stated location of far further east to the northeastern United States with its similarly heavily forested hills / low ridges of the Catskills mountains, north of New York City and further north up the Hudson River Valley of the semi-wilderness of the Adirondacks mountains of upstate northern New York state. Initial filming shooting was done there before a storm forced a later move of the movie set and production to Hollywood in Los Angeles to continue the interior scenes shot.

== Reception ==
Bosley Crowther of The New York Times suggested that Presley was miscast as a boxer, writing that he was "certainly no model for a statue of Hercules, and his skill at projecting an illusion of ferocity is of very low degree." However, Crowther found the film to be "moderately genial entertainment. It's not explosive, but it has the cheerful top of a lightly romantic contrivance that ranges between comedy and spoof. For this we can thank the other actors who played their roles ardently and Phil Karlson, who has directed at a brisk and deceptive pace."

Harrison's Reports graded the film as "Good": "Presley is surrounded by some very nice people. In lending him support, they give strength to a run-of-the-mill story that plays itself out with a simplicity of appeal and bountiful residue of entertainment. The film manages to give a pleasing account of itself."

A less positive notice in Variety read: "The story may be old, the direction not especially perceptive, the performances in several cases pretty poor, but United Artists' 'Kid Galahad' is apt to be a moneymaker in spite of all this."

John L. Scott in the Los Angeles Times called the story "old hat" but thought that it "should more than satisfy the horde of Presley fans."

The Monthly Film Bulletin wrote: "If the wit and intelligence lavished on the excellent dialogue had also been used to give a shred of ingenuity to the plot or a momentary sparkle to the lyrics, this would have been a much more amusing comedy ... Elvis Presley repeats the amiable oaf performance he gave recently in Follow That Dream, but it is nowhere near as funny, partly because his farcical opportunities are fewer, but mainly because it is hard to laugh continually at someone whose face is seen a couple of times bruised and bleeding in the ring."

Kid Galahad holds a 50% rating on Rotten Tomatoes based on six reviews.

== See also ==
- List of American films of 1962
- List of boxing films
- Elvis Presley on film and television
- Elvis Presley discography
