= Melting tank =

A melting tank is a tank used by manufacturing companies to manufacture a variety of products.

== Melting tank uses ==
Melting tanks can be designed to melt products such as:

- Alloys with a low melting temperature
- Babbitt
- Candle wax
- Capping compound
- Eutectic salts
- Gels
- Glue
- Oil
- Palm wax
- Paraffin
- Paraffin wax
- Plastics
- Resin
- Soap
- Solder
- Soy
- Synthetic adhesives
- Tar
- Vegetable oil

== Types of tanks ==
Different types of tanks are used for melting different substances. These tanks have various differentiating characteristics, such as temperature and surface texture. For example, tanks used for adhesives may need to heat up to 500 degrees(°) Fahrenheit(F), while an organic soy wax should not be heated above 140 °F. Furthermore, tanks designed for melting soaps and candles require a polished interior, in order to avoid cross-contamination between different scents and colors. Specialized coatings exist for such purposes.

=== Heating variations ===
Several heating variations of melting tanks exist:

- Direct heating: These tanks are generally made of aluminum and can heat up to over 500 °F, using a heating element placed directly onto the aluminum which, in turn, is directly touching the substance to be melted. Since these melters apply heat directly, they generally cannot be larger than 5-10 gallons. Common uses are heating wax and solder.
- Water-jacket heating: These tanks are similar in design to commercial double boilers in that they keep substances evenly heated, but generally only up to 212 °F, the boiling point of water. They are usually made of stainless steel, but can also be made of aluminum. Unlike direct heating melters, water-jacket melters can be almost unlimited in size, with 153 gallons being common, but sizes larger than 1000 gallons also possible. Combining the benefits of direct heating and water-jacket heating is currently being researched.
- Convection heating: These tanks use convection, making them less efficient in terms of the time it takes to heat up their contents. They are generally more expensive than the other types.
