= St. John Central Academy =

Location
- 3625 Guernsey Street; Bellaire, (Belmont County), Ohio 43906; United States; 40°1′9″N 80°44′35″W

Information
- Type: Private, Coeducational
- Patron saint: Saint John the Evangelist
- Established: 1857 (as St. John Central High School); 2019 (as St. John Central Academy
- Closed: 2025
- Grades: (Pre-K]–12
- Colors: Kelly green and White
- Fight song: Notre Dame Victory March
- Athletics conference: Ohio Valley Athletic Conference
- Mascot: Shamus
- Team name: Fighting Irish
- Newspaper: (formerly) Irish Inquirer (formerly) Irish Times
- Yearbook: The Centralite
- Website: https://www.sjcacademy.net/

St. John Central Academy was a private christian school in Bellaire, Ohio. Their nickname was the Fighting Irish, and their athletic teams competed as members of the Ohio Valley Athletic Conference.

From 1857 to 2019, a St. John Central High School operated as part of the Roman Catholic Diocese of Steubenville. The diocese announced on February 5, 2019 that the school would close in June 2019. However, a private committee established St. John Central Academy in the same building, opening the fall after the former school closed. The new academy inherited the history of St. John Central, including its athletic teams, but was considered a new entity with no affiliation to the diocese.

The academy closed on June 20, 2025 by the board of directors due to funding issues.

== Athletics ==
The school competes in Class 1A of the Ohio Valley Athletic Conference of the Ohio High School Athletic Association.

=== OHSAA state championships ===
- Girls Track and Field - 2007*, 2008
- Boys Cross Country - 2008

*tied with Gilmour Academy.

=== Cross Country ===
The St. John men's Cross Country team had won seven consecutive OVAC class A/AA titles (2003 to 2009) under the guidance of head coach Jeremy Midei. During that period they have won the over-all OVAC title six times (2007: 2nd to eventual WV Large School State Champions Wheeling Park). The team has also won the past four OHSAA division III eastern district titles, and OHSAA division III Central Regional titles, as well as capturing the 2008 OHSAA division III state title.
