= Beach Head War Cemetery =

CWGC cemetery in Anzio, Italy

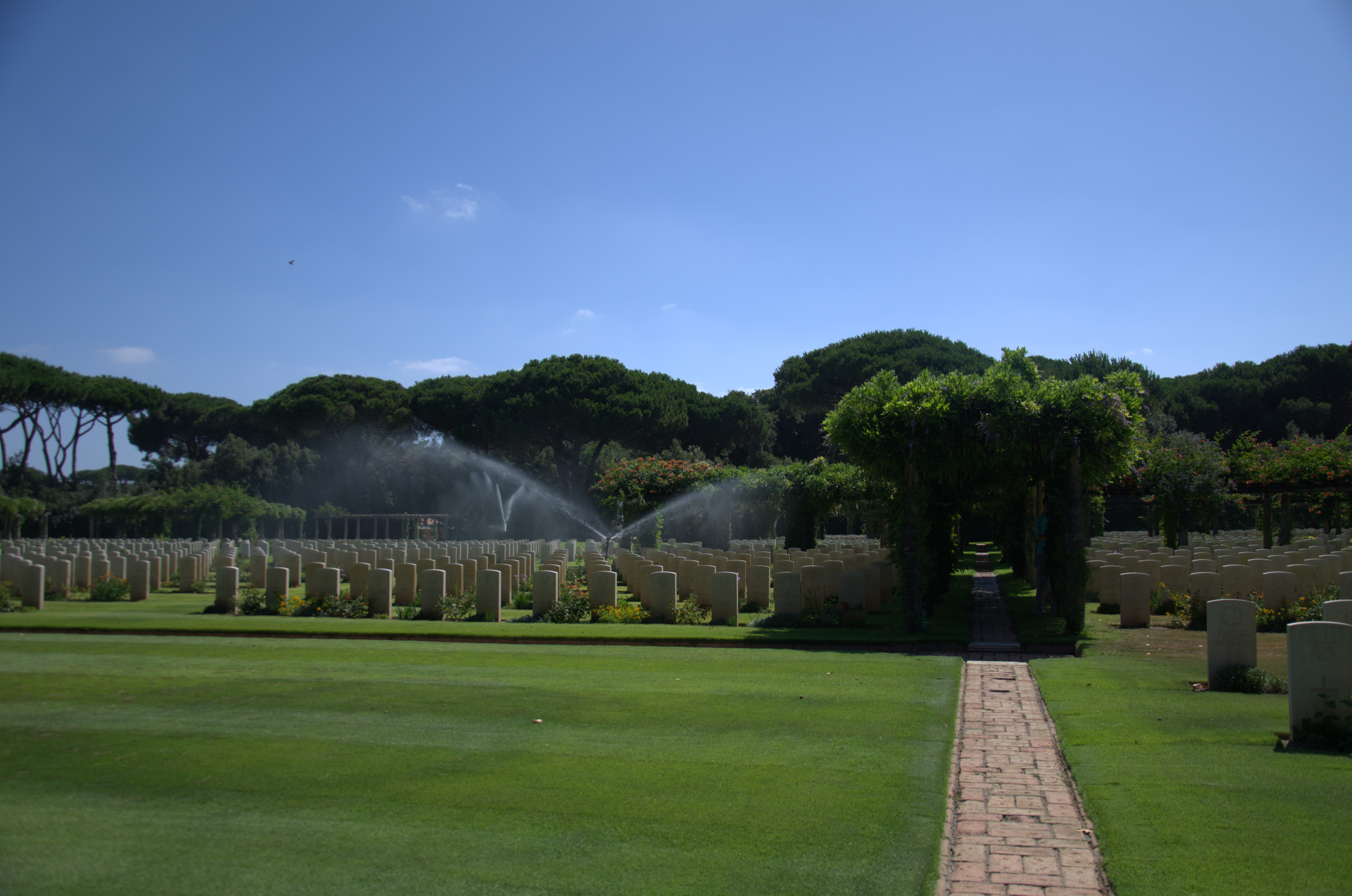
- Interactive map of Beach Head War Cemetery

Details
- Location: Via Nettunense, 60, 00042 Anzio, RM, Italy
- Country: Italy
- Coordinates: 41.482°N 12.625°E
- Owned by: Commonwealth War Graves Commission
- No. of graves: 2,316
- Website: CWGC official website
- Find a Grave: Beach Head War Cemetery

The Beach Head War Cemetery near Anzio is a Commonwealth cemetery of the Second World War. It contains graves resulting mostly from Operation Shingle and subsequent military actions in Italy.

The cemetery contains 2,316 Commonwealth burials of the Second World War, 2,025 of them identified, including Victoria Cross recipient, Sergeant Maurice Rogers and British flying ace Flight Lieutenant Arthur Hodgkinson. There is also one First World War burial which was brought from Chieti Communal Cemetery near Rome.

The cemetery was designed by British architect Louis de Soissons.

== See also ==
- Anzio War Cemetery
- Sicily–Rome American Cemetery and Memorial
- List of cemeteries in Italy
