= Ohio Regional Campus Conference =

- Founded: 1973
- No. of teams: 5
- Region: Ohio

Locations
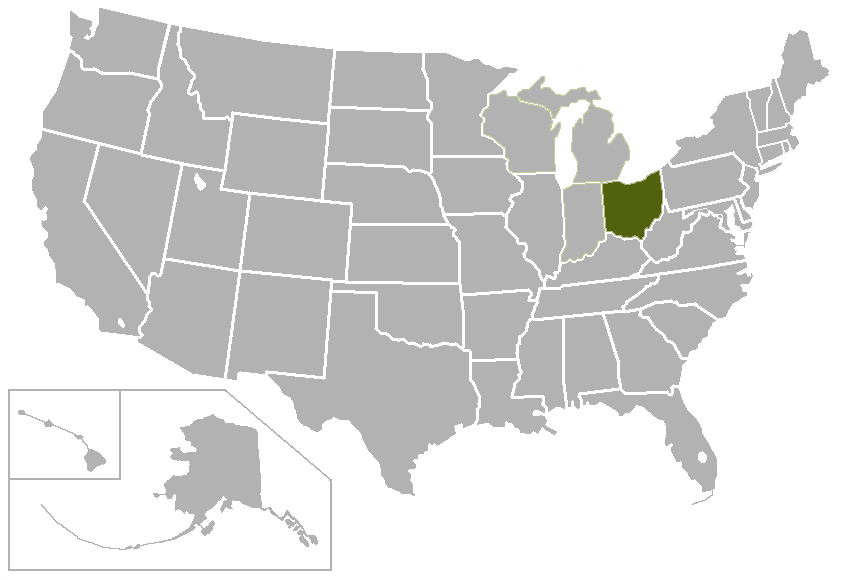

The Ohio Regional Campus Conference was founded in 1973 and is an independent sports organization that serves the State of Ohio's regional campuses. The ORCC has eleven members and currently fields eight sports - women's volleyball, women's basketball, men's basketball, women's softball, women's tennis, men's baseball, men's tennis, and golf (co-ed). The ORCC does not currently have a website.

== Member schools ==
=== Current members ===
The ORCC currently has five full members, all are public schools:

Institution	Location (Note: All cities are located within the State of Ohio.)	Founded	Affiliation	Enrollment	Nickname	Joined	Colors
Miami University–Hamilton	Hamilton	1968	Public (Note: Part of the Miami University sub-system as a regional campus.)	2,514	Harriers	?	
Miami University–Middletown	Middletown	1966	Public	1,492	ThunderHawks	?	
The Ohio State University at Lima / Rhodes State College	Lima	1960	Public (Note: Part of the Ohio State University sub-system as a regional campus.)	874 / 1,845	Barons	?	/
The Ohio State University at Mansfield / North Central State College	Mansfield	1958	Public	954 / 3,094	Mavericks	?	/
Wayne College (Note: Also known as the University of Akron Wayne College.)	Orrville	1972	Public (Note: Part of the University of Akron sub-system as a satellite campus.)	1,475	Warriors	?	

=== Former members ===
The ORCC had over five former full members, all were public schools. All Ohio University branch campuses dropped sports, effective the 2021 fall semester:

Institution	Location (Note: All cities are located within the State of Ohio.)	Founded	Affiliation	Enrollment	Nickname	Joined	Left	Colors	Current conference
Ohio University–Chillicothe	Chillicothe	1946	Public (Note: Part of the Ohio University sub-system as a regional campus.)	1,479	Hilltoppers	?	2021		N/A
Ohio University–Eastern / Belmont College	St. Clairsville	1957	Public	516 / 721	Panthers	?	2021	/	N/A
Ohio University–Lancaster	Lancaster	1956	Public	516	Cougars & Lady Cougars	?	2021		N/A
Ohio University–Southern	Ironton	1956	Public	1,105	Trailblazers	?	2021		N/A
Ohio University–Zanesville / Zane State College	Zanesville	1946	Public	1,001 / 3,444	Tracers	?	2021	/	N/A

== Champions ==
=== Women's basketball ===
Year	ORCC Champions	ORC State Tournament Champions
1976-77		Kent State–Tuscarawas
1977-78		Ohio–Lancaster
1978-79	Miami–Middletown (co)	Kent State–Stark
1979-80		Kent State–Stark
1980-81		Ohio State–Newark
1981-82	Ohio State–Newark	Kent State–Trumball
1982-83	Ohio State–Newark	Ohio State–Newark
1983-84		Ohio–Zanesville
1984-85	Ohio–Chillicothe	Ohio–Lancaster
1985-86		Ohio–Zanesville
1986-87	Miami–Middletown	Miami–Middletown
1987-88		Miami–Middletown
1988-89	Miami–Middletown	Miami–Middletown
1989-90	Ohio–Lancaster	Ohio–Belmont (Note: Currently known as Ohio–Eastern.)
1990-91	Ohio State–Lima	Ohio State–Lima
1991-92	Ohio State–Lima, Miami–Middletown	Akron–Wayne
1992-93	Ohio–Chillicothe	Ohio–Chillicothe
1993-94	Ohio State–Lima	Ohio–Eastern
1994-95	Ohio–Eastern	Ohio–Eastern
1995-96		Ohio–Eastern
1996-97		Ohio–Eastern
1997-98	Akron–Wayne	Akron–Wayne
1998-99	Ohio State–Newark	Akron–Wayne
1999-2000	Ohio State–Newark	Ohio State–Newark
2000-01	Ohio State–Newark	Ohio State–Newark
2001-02	Miami–Middletown	Ohio State–Newark
2002-03	Ohio–Eastern	Ohio–Eastern
2003-04	Ohio State–Lima	Miami–Hamilton
2004-05	Miami–Hamilton	Ohio–Lancaster
2005-06	Ohio–Chillicothe, Ohio–Zanesville	Ohio–Zanesville
2006-07	Ohio–Zanesville	Miami–Middletown
2007-08	Ohio–Zanesville	Ohio–Zanesville
2008-09	East: Ohio State–Newark, Ohio–Eastern; West: UC Clermont	UC Clermont
2009-10	East: Ohio–Eastern; West: UC Clermont?	UC Clermont
2010-11	East: Ohio–Eastern; West: Miami–Middletown	Ohio–Eastern
2011-12	East: Ohio–Eastern; West: Miami–Middletown	Ohio–Eastern
2012-13	East: Ohio–Eastern; West: Miami–Hamilton	Miami–Hamilton
2013-14	Ohio–Lancaster	Ohio–Lancaster
2014-15	Ohio–Lancaster	Ohio–Lancaster
2015-16	Ohio–Chillicothe	

=== Women's softball ===
Year	ORCC Champions	ORC State Tournament Champions
2003	Miami–Middletown	
2007	Ohio State–Newark	Ohio State–Newark
2008	Ohio State–Newark	Ohio State–Newark
2009	Ohio State–Newark	Ohio State–Newark
2010	Ohio State–Newark	Ohio State–Newark
2011	Ohio–Chillicothe	Ohio–Chillicothe
2012	Miami–Hamilton	Miami–Hamilton
2013	Ohio State–Newark, Ohio–Chillicothe, Miami–Hamilton	Miami–Hamilton
2014	Ohio–Chillicothe	Miami–Hamilton
2015	Ohio State–Newark, Ohio–Chillicothe, Ohio–Zanesville	Ohio State–Newark
2016	Ohio–Lancaster, Ohio–Chillicothe	
2017	Ohio–Chillicothe	
2018	Ohio–Chillicothe	Miami–Hamilton

=== Women's tennis ===
Year	ORCC Champions	ORC State Tournament Champions
1976	Miami–Middletown	
1977	Miami–Middletown	Miami–Middletown
1978	n/a	n/a
1979	Miami–Middletown	
1980	Miami–Middletown	
1981	Miami–Middletown	Miami–Middletown
1982	Miami–Middletown	
1983	Miami–Middletown	
1984	Miami–Middletown	Miami–Middletown
1985-1988	n/a	n/a
1989	Miami–Middletown	Miami–Middletown
1991	Miami–Middletown	
1992	Miami–Middletown	Miami–Middletown
1993	Miami–Middletown	Miami–Middletown
1994	Miami–Middletown	Miami–Middletown
1995	Miami–Middletown	Miami–Middletown
1996	Miami–Middletown	Miami–Middletown
1997	Miami–Middletown, Miami–Hamilton	Miami–Middletown
1998	Miami–Middletown	
1999	Miami–Middletown	
2000	Miami–Hamilton	
2001	Miami–Hamilton	
2002	Ohio–Lancaster	
2003	Miami–Hamilton	
2004	n/a	n/a
2005	Miami–Middletown	
2006	Miami–Middletown	
2007	Miami–Hamilton	Miami–Middletown
2008-2009	n/a	n/a
2010		Ohio–Chillicothe
2011	Miami–Hamilton	
2012		Ohio–Eastern

=== Women's volleyball ===
Year	ORCC Champions	ORC State Tournament Champions
1981	Ohio State–Newark	Ohio State–Newark
1982	n/a	n/a
1983		Ohio State Lima
1984		Ohio State–Lima
1985		Ohio State–Lima
1986	Ohio State–Lima, Miami–Middletown	Ohio State–Lima
1987	Miami–Middletown	Miami–Middletown
1988		Ohio State–Lima
1989	Ohio State–Lima	
1990	Ohio State–Lima	Ohio State–Lima
1991	Ohio State–Lima, Ohio State–Newark	Ohio State–Newark
1992	Ohio State–Lima	
1993	Ohio State–Newark	Ohio State–Lima
1994	Ohio State–Newark	
1995	Ohio State–Lima	Ohio State–Lima
1996	Ohio State–Lima	Ohio State–Lima
1997	Ohio State–Lima	Ohio State–Newark
1998	Ohio State–Lima	Ohio State–Lima
1999		Ohio State–Lima
2000	Ohio State–Lima	Ohio State–Lima
2001	Ohio State–Newark	
2002	Ohio State–Newark	Ohio State–Newark
2003	Ohio State–Newark	Ohio State–Newark
2004	Ohio State Newark	Ohio State Newark
2005	Ohio State Newark	Ohio State Newark
2006	East: Ohio State–Newark; West: UC Clermont	Ohio State–Newark
2007	East: Ohio State–Newark; West: UC Clermont	Ohio State–Newark
2008	East: Ohio State–Newark; West: UC Clermont	Miami–Middletown
2009	East: Ohio–Lancaster; West: UC Clermont	UC–Clermont
2010	East: Ohio State–Newark; West: Miami–Middletown	Miami–Middletown
2011	East: Akron–Wayne; West: Miami–Hamilton	Akron–Wayne
2012	East: Ohio State–Newark; West: Miami–Middletown, Ohio–Chillicothe	Ohio–Chillicothe
2013		Ohio–Eastern
2014		Miami–Hamilton
2015		Ohio–Chillicothe
2016		Ohio State–Lima
2017	Ohio–Chillicothe	Ohio–Chillicothe
2018	Miami–Hamilton	Ohio–Chillicothe
2019	OhioChillicothe	Miami–Hamilton

=== Men's baseball ===
Year	ORCC Champions	ORC State Tournament Champions
1981	Ohio State–Newark	
1982	n/a	n/a
1983		Ohio State–Newark
1984-1985	n/a	n/a
1986		Ohio State–Newark
1988	Ohio State–Newark	Ohio State–Newark
1989	n/a	n/a
1990	Ohio–Zanesville	
1991	Ohio State–Lima	
1992	Ohio State–Lima	
1993	Ohio State–Lima, Ohio–Zanesville	Ohio–Zanesville
1994	Miami–Middletown	Miami–Middletown
1995	Miami–Middletown	Miami–Middletown
1996	Miami–Middletown	Miami–Middletown
1997	Miami–Middletown, Ohio State–Newark	Ohio State–Newark
1998	Ohio–Zanesville	
1999	Miami–Middletown	Miami–Middletown
2000	Miami–Hamilton	
2001	Miami–Hamilton	
2002	Miami–Hamilton	
2003	Miami–Hamilton	
2004	Miami–Hamilton	
2005	Ohio State–Newark	Ohio State–Newark
2006	Miami–Hamilton	
2007	Miami–Hamilton	Miami–Hamilton
2008-2009	n/a	n/a
2010	Miami–Hamilton	
2011	n/a	n/a
2012		Miami–Hamilton
2013	Miami–Hamiton	Miami–Hamilton

=== Men's basketball ===
Year	ORCC Champions	ORC State Tournament Champions
1966-67		Kent State–Ashtabula
1967-68		Kent State–Ashtabula
1968-69		Kent State–Stark
1969-70		Kent State–Stark
1970-71		Ohio–Portsmouth
1971-72		Miami–Middletown
1972-73		Bowling Green State–Firelands
1973-74	Ohio–Chillicothe	Ohio–Chillicothe
1974-75		Ohio–Chillicothe
1975-76	Miami–Middletown, Ohio–Chillicothe	Ohio–Chillicothe
1976-77	Ohio–Chillicothe	Ohio–Chillicothe
1977-78	Ohio–Chillicothe	Ohio–Zanesville
1978-79		Ohio–Chillicothe
1979-80	Ohio–Chillicothe	Ohio–Chillicothe
1980-81	Ohio–Chillicothe	Ohio–Chillicothe
1981-82		Ohio–Chillicothe
1982-83	Ohio State–Newark, Ohio–Chillicothe	Ohio–Chillicothe
1983-84	Miami–Middletown	Ohio State–Lima
1984-85	Miami–Middletown	Akron–Wayne
1985-86	Ohio State–Lima, Miami–Middletown	Ohio–Chillicothe
1986-87	Ohio State–Lima, Ohio State–Newark	Ohio State–Newark
1987-88		Ohio State–Lima
1988-89	Miami–Middletown, Ohio–Chillicothe	Ohio State–Lima
1989-90	Ohio–Chillicothe	Ohio–Chillicothe
1990-91	Ohio State–Lima, Ohio State–Newark	Ohio–Chillicothe
1992-93	Ohio–Chillicothe	Ohio–Chillicothe
1993-94	Miami–Middletown	UC Clermont
1994-95	Miami–Middletown	Miami–Middletown
1995-96	Miami–Middletown	Akron–Wayne or Ohio–Chillicothe
1996-97		UC Clermont
1997-98	Miami–Hamilton	UC Clermont
1998-99	Miami–Hamilton	Miami–Hamilton
1999-2000	Miami–Hamilton	Miami–Hamilton
2000-01	Miami–Middletown	Ohio–Eastern
2001-02	Miami–Middletown	Miami–Middletown
2002-03	Miami–Middletown	Miami–Middletown
2003-04	Miami–Middletown	Miami–Middletown
2004-05	Miami–Middletown	UC Clermont
2005-06	UC Clermont	Ohio–Eastern
2006-07	Miami–Middletown	UC Clermont
2007-08	Miami–Middletown	UC Clermont
2008-09	Miami–Middletown, Ohio–Lancaster	Miami–Middletown
2009-10	East: Ohio–Eastern; West: Miami–Middletown	Miami–Middletown
2010-11	Miami–Middletown	Miami–Middletown
2011-12	East: Ohio State–Newark, Akron–Wayne; West: Miami–Middletown	Miami–Middletown
2012-13	East: Ohio State–Newark, Akron–Wayne; West: Miami–Middletown	Akron–Wayne
2013-14 to 2015-16	n/a	n/a
2016-17	Miami–Hamilton	Miami–Middletown
2017-18	Miami–Hamilton	Miami–Hamilton
2018-19	Miami–Hamilton	Miami–Hamilton

=== Golf ===
Year	ORCC Champions	ORC State Tournament Champions
1979		Miami–Middletown
1980-1981	n/a	n/a
1982	Miami–Middletown	
1983	Miami–Middletown	Miami–Middletown
1984	Ohio State–Lima	Ohio State–Lima
1985	n/a	n/a
1986	Ohio–Lancaster	Ohio State–Lima
1987-1988	n/a	n/a
1989	Ohio State–Newark	Ohio State–Newark
1990	n/a	n/a
1991	Ohio State–Lima	Ohio State–Lima
1992	n/a	n/a
1993		Miami–Middletown
1994	Ohio–Chillicothe	
1995	Miami–Hamilton	
1996-1997	n/a	n/a
1998	Ohio–Zanesville	Miami–Middletown
1999	Miami–Middletown	
2000	Miami–Middletown	Miami–Middletown
2001	Miami–Middletown	Miami–Middletown
2002	Ohio–Zanesville	
2003	Miami–Middletown	Miami–Middletown
2004	Miami–Middletown	
2005	Miami–Hamilton	
2006	Miami–Hamilton	
2007	Ohio State–Lima	Ohio State–Lima
2008	Ohio State–Lima	Ohio State–Lima
2009	Ohio State–Newark	
2010	Akron–Wayne	Akron–Wayne
2011	Akron–Wayne	Ohio State–Newark
2012	Ohio State–Lima	Ohio State–Lima
2013	Akron–Wayne	Akron–Wayne

=== Men's tennis ===
Year	ORCC Champions	ORC State Tournament Champions
1976	Miami–Middletown	
1977	Miami–Middletown	
1978-1979	n/a	n/a
1980	Miami–Middletown	Miami–Middletown
1981	Miami–Middletown	Miami–Middletown
1982	Miami–Middletown	Miami–Middletown
1983	Miami–Middletown	Miami–Middletown
1984	Miami–Middletown	Miami–Middletown
1985-1986	n/a	n/a
1987	Miami–Middletown	Miami–Middletown
1988	Miami–Middletown	
1989	Miami–Middletown, Ohio State–Lima	
1990-1992	n/a	n/a
1993	Miami–Hamilton	
1994	Miami–Hamilton	
1995	n/a	n/a
1996	Miami–Middletown	Miami–Middletown
1997	Miami–Middletown, Miami–Hamilton	
1998	Miami–Hamilton	
1999	n/a	n/a
2000	Ohio–Lancaster	
2001	Miami–Hamilton	
2002	n/a	n/a
2003	Miami–Middletown	
2004-2005	n/a	n/a
2006	Miami–Hamilton	
2007	Miami–Hamilton	
2008	n/a	n/a
2009	Miami–Hamilton	Miami–Hamilton
2010	n/a	n/a
2011	Miami–Hamilton	Miami–Hamilton
2012	Miami–Hamilton	Miami–Hamilton

=== All Sports Champions ===
Year	All Sports Champions
1980-81	Miami–Middletown
1981-82	Miami–Middletown
1982-83	Ohio State–Newark
1983-84	Miami–Middletown
1984-85	Ohio State–Lima
1985-86	Ohio State–Lima
1986-87	Miami–Middletown
1987-88	Miami–Middletown
1988-89 to 1989-90	n/a
1990-91	Ohio State–Lima
1992-93	Ohio State–Lima
1993-94	Miami–Middletown
1994-95	Miami–Middletown
1995-96	Miami–Middletown
1996-97	Miami–Middletown
1997-98	Miami–Middletown
1998-99	Miami–Middletown
1999-2000	Miami–Middletown
2000-01	Miami–Middletown
2001-02	Miami–Middletown
2002-03	Miami–Middletown
2003-04	Miami–Middletown
2004-05	Ohio State–Newark
2005-06	Ohio State–Newark
2006-07	Ohio State–Newark
2007-08	n/a
2008-09	Ohio State–Newark
2009-10	Miami–Hamilton
