= John Glenn High School (New Concord, Ohio) =

Coordinates: 40°0′28″N 81°44′32″W

- 13115 John Glenn; New Concord, OH 43762

Information
- Type: Public
- Established: 1965
- Principal: Scott Carpenter
- Enrollment: 543 (2023-2024)
- Team name: Maroon and white
- Information: (740) 826-7641
- Mascot: Muskie
- Website: School website

John Glenn High School is a public high school in New Concord, Ohio. It is the only high school in the East Muskingum Local School District. Their nickname is the Little Muskies, taken from nearby Muskingum University's nickname, the Muskies.

== Athletics ==
John Glenn competes in the Muskingum Valley League. In addition, JGHS has programs such as wrestling, football, basketball, baseball, volleyball, swimming, soccer, track and field, golf, lacrosse, marching band, and cross country.

=== Ohio High School Athletic Association State Championships ===
- Boys Basketball - 2016

John Glenn won its first-ever OHSAA school state title over 7-time boys basketball state champion St. Vincent-St. Mary High School, 76-72, on March 19th, 2016 in the D-II OHSAA Championship Game.

== Course offerings ==
John Glenn High School offers 6 AP classes, in Art, US History, US Government, English, Chemistry, and Psychology. Its science classes include Physical Science, Biology, Ecology, Chemistry, Physics, Zoology, Anatomy and Physiology, and Astronomy and Geology. The school also offers two foreign languages, Spanish and French. In the past, the school also offered German.

The school also offers College Credit Plus classes that can receive both college and high school credit. While most of these courses can be taken at nearby Muskingum University, Ohio University – Zanesville, and Zane State College, some classes such as Calculus can be taken on campus.

== Music ==
In addition to a band and choir, John Glenn High School also has a string orchestra. The band consists of a marching and concert band, as well as PanJGea, a steel drum group. JG Company is a travelling subset of the choir. The school also has a strolling strings group, String Sounds.

In November 2016, JGHS Marching Band received a Superior rating in class B at the OMEA State Marching Band Finals.

In February 2018, JGHS Orchestra received a Superior rating in class C at OMEA state contest.

In November 2021, JGHS Marching Band received a Superior rating in class B at the OMEA State Marching Band Finals.

In April 2022, JGHS Concert Band received a Superior rating in class C at OMEA State Concert Band Finals for the first time in school history.

== Background ==
John Glenn High School gets its name from its most famous alumnus, John Glenn, the former U.S. Senator and first American to orbit Earth, who graduated when the school was still New Concord High School. The school is located in Glenn's hometown of New Concord, Ohio and Glenn himself was an active participant in and enthusiast of the school and its community. For these reasons, the school's students, staff, and community boast that they are the only "real" John Glenn High School in the United States.
