= Anzio War Cemetery =

CWGC cemetery in Italy

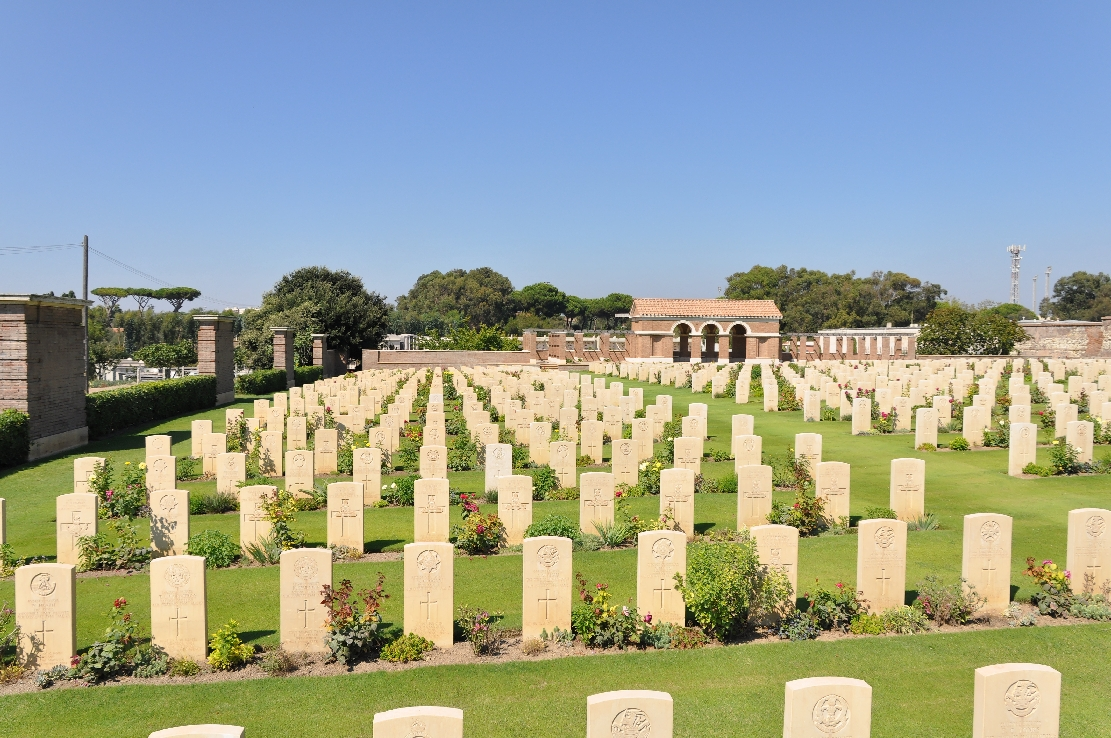
- Interactive map of Anzio War Cemetery

Details
- Location: Anzio, Lazio
- Country: Italy
- Coordinates: 41.456°N 12.623°E
- Owned by: Commonwealth War Graves Commission
- No. of graves: 1,056
- Website: CWGC official website
- Find a Grave: Anzio War Cemetery

The Commonwealth of Nations Anzio War Cemetery is to be found about a kilometer from Anzio town in the Lazio region of Italy. It is located 70 kilometres (43 miles) south of Rome. It should not be confused with the Commonwealth Beach Head War Cemetery some 3,5 kilometers to the north or the American Sicily–Rome American Cemetery and Memorial, which is located in the nearby town of Nettuno.

== Description and history ==
Anzio War Cemetery is a special and communal cemetery for the local and surrounding peoples. It contains 1,056 graves resulting from Operation Shingle in 1944 as part of World War II. Having seen the make up of the 1st Canadian Division which was sent there in 1944 it is clear from the graves that those who rest there were from the units of the 1st Division. There were 1,037 identified casualties.

Poem

There is a poem about the Anzio War Cemetery written by Michael Elliott-Binns. It is written from the perspective of a man that had experienced a loss in the battle and that was writing for his own personal reasons. The author later commented that "They [the fallen soldiers] seem to be buried on the doorstep of their home."

Song

There is a line in a 2014 song "To Hell and Back" by Sabaton which was reportedly taken from a poem by Audie Murphy: "Crosses grow on Anzio Where no soldiers sleep And where hell is six feet deep"

== See also ==
- List of cemeteries in Italy
