= Shaeffer Campbell Covered Bridge =

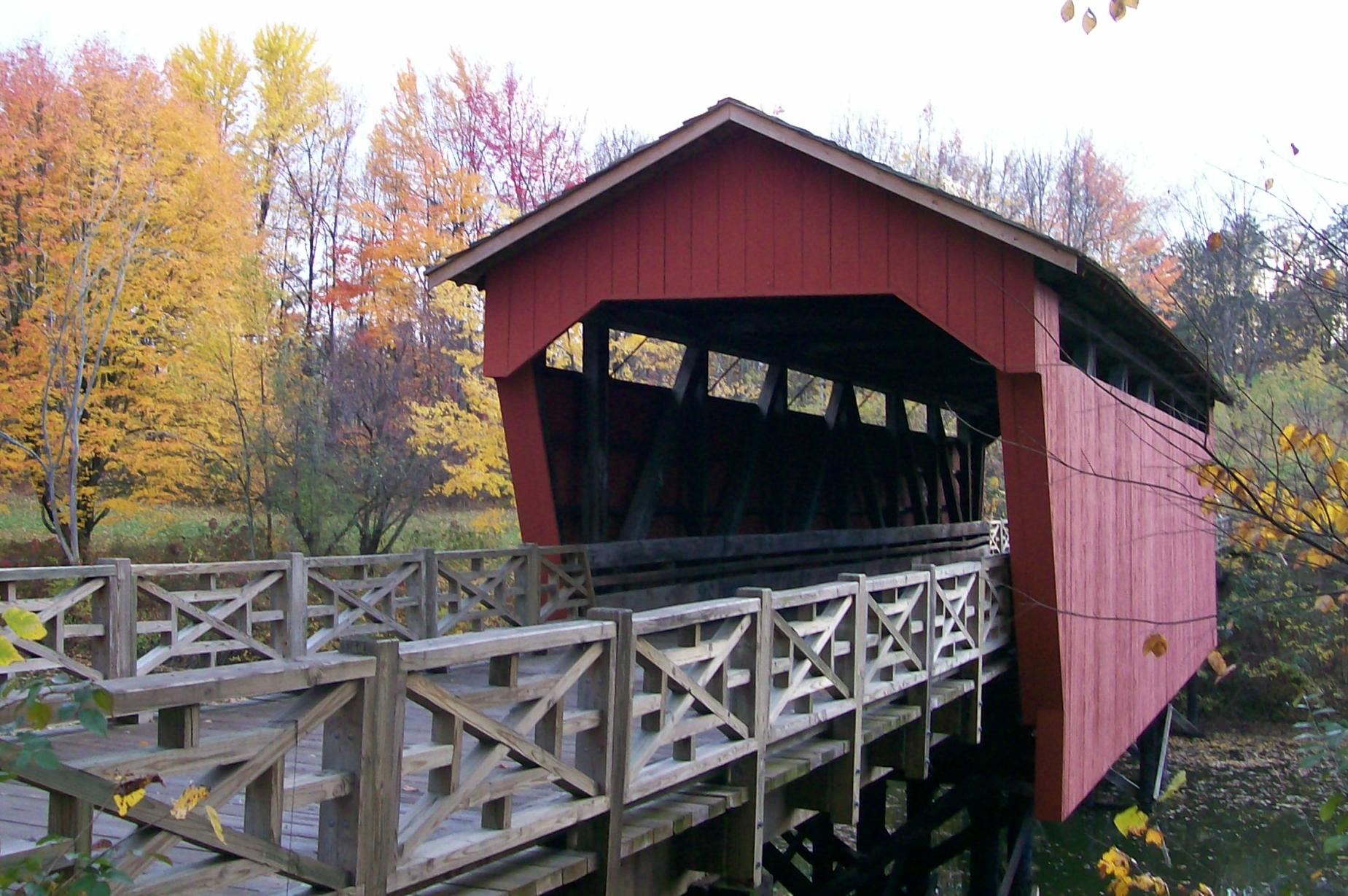
- Shaeffer Campbell Covered Bridge in 2009.
- Coordinates: 40°04′28″N 80°58′15″W
- Carries: Pedestrian
- Crosses: College Pond
- Locale: Belmont County, Ohio

Characteristics
- Design: Multiple kingpost truss
- Material: Wood
- Total length: 68 feet (21 m)

The Shaeffer Campbell Covered Bridge is located on the College Pond on the campus of Ohio University Eastern Campus in St. Clairsville, Ohio.

== History ==
The bridge was once located in Fairfield County, south of Amanda on Clear Creek. The bridge was built in 1875 in the multiple kingpost truss style. The county contains many examples of that style built by Fairfield native and expert covered bridge builder, James W. Buchanan, the man credited as being the builder of the Shaeffer Campbell Bridge.

The bridge was damaged when a farm tractor fell through the floor in 1973, and it was donated to Belmont County in 1975. Belmont County did not have any covered bridges at the time, as its last covered bridge over Captina Creek had collapsed under the weight of a coal truck in 1953. The bridge was dismantled and taken to a county garage in Lloydsville, where it was reassembled and reconditioned. The bridge was placed over the College Pond in 1975 with a dedication by the county engineer, R.J. Boccabella.

== Appearance ==
The 68-foot-long (21 m) wooden bridge sits atop wooden slat-pressured trusses that reach into the muddy bottom of the College Pond. The railings of the approaches to the bridge are designed to mirror railings found on the home of famous American writer Mark Twain. The flat wooden floor of the bridge was built to support loads of wagons and horses, but has not been reinforced for automobile usage, leaving it closed to vehicular traffic but open to pedestrians, such as a cross country event for local high schools every year.

The bridge has slanted front supports, allowing the roof to extend further than the sides. The shingles on the roof are laid in a way to allow water to run off without leaking through the small gaps between panels. The sides of the bridge are wooden planks nailed vertically with a small gap between the roof and the top of the side walls. The bridge is normally painted red and is visible from both lanes of Interstate 70, which runs less than 1,000 feet (300 m) south of the bridge.
