= UAWC (disambiguation) =

UAWC Can refer to:

- Union of Agricultural Work Committees, a Palestinian non-profit supporting farmers.
- Wayne College, is a branch campus of the University of Akron.
