= Arthur Hodgkinson (RAF officer) =

British flying ace of WWII

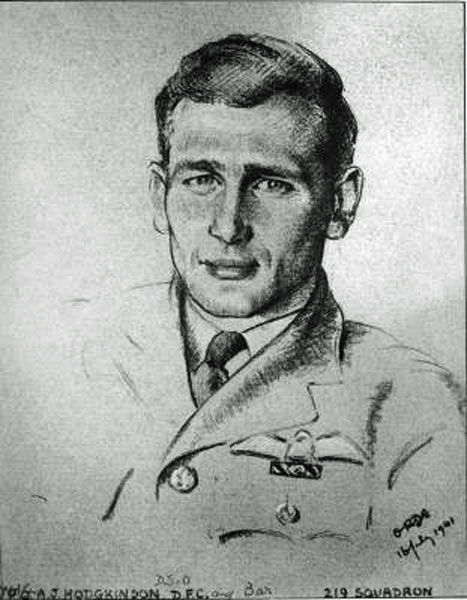
- Portrait of Hodgkinson, made by the official war artist Cuthbert Orde in July 1941
- Born: 1916; Hampstead, London, United Kingdom
- Died: 10 July 1943 (aged 26–27) †; Rome, Italy
- Burial place: Beach Head War Cemetery, Anzio, Italy
- Military career
- Allegiance: United Kingdom
- Branch: Royal Air Force
- Rank: Flight Lieutenant
- Units: No. 219 Squadron (1940–1941); No. 264 Squadron (1942–1943); No. 23 Squadron (1943)
- Conflicts: Second World War: Battle of Britain; The Blitz; Allied invasion of Sicily
- Awards: Distinguished Service Order; Distinguished Flying Cross & Bar; Mention in Despatches

Arthur Hodgkinson DSO, DFC & Bar (1916–10 July 1943) was a British flying ace of the Royal Air Force (RAF) during the Second World War. He is credited with the destruction of twelve aircraft.

From Hampstead, Hodgkinson joined the RAF in 1932, training as a mechanic. He was subsequently accepted for pilot training and by mid-1940 was serving with No. 219 Squadron as a sergeant pilot. Flying Bristol Blenheims and then Bristol Beaufighters on night fighting patrols over southeast England, he became one of the squadron's more successful pilots. During his time with the squadron he was commissioned, awarded the Distinguished Flying Cross and Bar, and mentioned in despatches. Rested for several months from late 1941 to early 1942, he was then posted to No. 264 Squadron, again on night fighting duties but with the De Havilland Mosquito heavy fighter. In February 1943, he was sent to Malta where he served with No. 23 Squadron, flying Mosquitos on intruder sorties to Sicily and mainland Italy. He and his navigator were killed on one such sortie to Rome, on 10 July 1943. He was posthumously awarded the Distinguished Service Order.

== Early life ==
Arthur John Hodgkinson was born in 1916 at Hampstead in London, United Kingdom. He was the son of William and Louise Hodgkinson. After completing his education at Amersham Grammar School, he joined the Royal Air Force (RAF) in 1932 as an apprentice airman. He completed his training in late 1934 as a qualified engine mechanic. He subsequently applied for flying training, was accepted and by mid-1940 had gained his wings.

== Second World War ==
=== Battle of Britain ===
By the early stages of the Battle of Britain, Hodgkinson was serving with No. 219 Squadron as a sergeant pilot. The squadron was equipped with the Bristol Blenheim, operating it primarily in a night fighter role from Catterick, although it also carried out convoy patrols. On a night sortie, carried out on 21 July, Hodgkinson engaged and damaged a German aircraft of an unknown type to the west of Church Fenton. By mid-August, the aerial fighting over the southeast of England had intensified and detachments of the squadron moved south to Redhill to assist in intercepting daytime raids mounted by the Luftwaffe. On one of these, on 15 August, Hodgkinson damaged a Junkers Ju 88 medium bomber in the vicinity of Flamborough Head.

=== The Blitz ===
In September, No. 219 Squadron began converting to the new Bristol Beaufighter heavy fighter and became operational from Redhill with the type in October, patrolling over London. However, the squadron continued to use the Blenheim for several more weeks. Flying one of these on 25 October, Hodgkinson shot down a Dornier Do 17 medium bomber near Kenley. For much of the winter, there were no engagements with Luftwaffe aircraft but on the night of 26 February 1941, now piloting a Beaufighter and paired with Sergeant Bertram Dye as his radar operator, Hodgkinson damaged a Heinkel He 111 medium bomber near Tangmere. By this time he held the rank of pilot officer, having been commissioned that month. He destroyed a Do 17 near Winchester on 13 March. A few days later, he was mentioned in despatches.

On the night of 7 April Hodgkinson, by now one of the more successful pilots of No. 219 Squadron, destroyed a He 111 near Worthing. Three nights later he probably destroyed a medium bomber, either a Ju 88 or a He 111, off Beachy Head. The next day, he was recognised for his successes with an award of the Distinguished Flying Cross (DFC) while Dye was rewarded with the Distinguished Flying Medal (DFM). The announcement was made on 11 April; the citation for Hodgkinson's DFC, published in The London Gazette, read:

This officer has carried out numerous operational flights. He has destroyed at least three enemy aircraft, of which two were destroyed at night. His eagerness to seek and destroy the enemy at night has set a splendid example to his fellow pilots.

— London Gazette, No. 35134, 11 April 1941

On the last night of April, Hodgkinson destroyed a He 111 to the south of Shoreham. He also damaged an aircraft of an unknown type the same evening, over Petersfield. He shot down a He 111 east of Selsey Bill on the night of 9 May, and this was followed by the destruction of another He 111 close to Worthing on the night of 16 May. A Bar to the DFC was awarded to Hodgkinson in early June. The published citation, which also acknowledged Dye (who was awarded a Bar to his DFM at the same time) read:

Pilot Officer Hodgkinson and Sergeant Dye have flown together in many night fighting operations as pilot and wireless operator respectively. Both have displayed exceptional skill and keenness which, combined with excellent team work, has resulted in the destruction of at least 6 enemy aircraft at night.

— London Gazette, No. 35183, 6 June 1941

Later in the month, on 21 June, Hodgkinson shot down what was most likely a He 111 over Portsmouth. Four nights later, he destroyed a He 111 south of Selsey Bill. His last aerial victory while serving with No. 219 Squadron was a Ju 88 that was destroyed on the night of 27 July, near Horsham.

=== Later war service ===
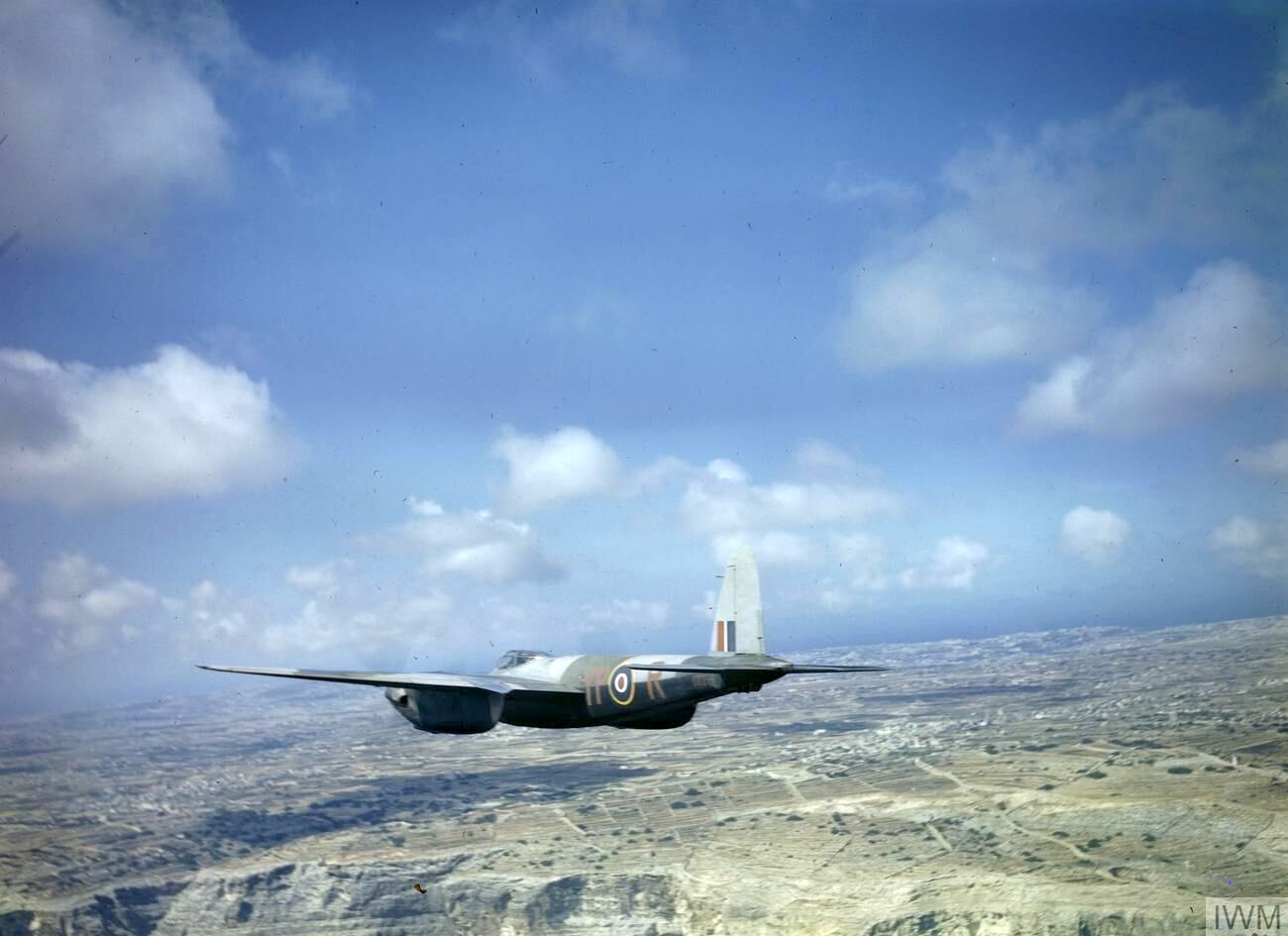
A De Havilland Mosquito of No. 23 Squadron over Malta, June 1943

Hodgkinson spent the later months of 1941 on a period of rest and did not return to operations until March 1942, when he and Dye were posted to No. 264 Squadron. By this time Hodgkinson held the rank of flying officer. His new unit was based at Colerne and engaged in night fighting duties but within weeks of Hodgkinson's arrival commenced converting from the obsolete Boulton Paul Defiant turret-fighter to the De Havilland Mosquito heavy fighter. It became operational with these in early June. Hodgkinson damaged a Dornier Do 217 medium bomber to the southeast of Portland Bill on the night of 28 June. Otherwise, contact with the Luftwaffe was scarce and as the squadron entered the winter of 1942–1943, it commenced patrolling the Bay of Biscay and the Western Approaches.

Hodgkinson was promoted to flight lieutenant and posted to No. 23 Squadron in February 1943. This was based on the island of Malta and, equipped with Mosquitos, tasked with carrying out night-time intruder sorties to Sicily and mainland Italy, targeting airfields initially, then transportation infrastructure. Paired with Warrant Officer W. Woodman as his navigator, Hodgkinson destroyed a He 111 over the Sicilian city of Catania on the night of 15 March. The following week, during a sortie to attack trains in the west of Sicily, Woodman was killed when the duo's Mosquito was hit by ground fire. Hodgkinson was able to fly the aircraft back to the squadron's airfield on Malta. On the night of 26 April, he destroyed a pair of Ju 88s over western Sicily.

Hodgkinson and his navigator, Sergeant V. Crapper, were killed on the night of 10 July. While conducting a low-level sortie over Rome, their Mosquito flew into cables and crashed onto the racetrack in Rome's Centocelle quarter. Hodgkinson was posthumously awarded the Distinguished Service Order. The published citation, which noted that he had gone missing, read:

This officer has completed much operational flying. Latterly, in the Middle East, he has bombed targets in Tunisia, Italy and Sicily and, during these operations, he has attacked numerous locomotives to good effect, while fires have been started in railway installations and sidings as a result of his determined work. In addition, Flight Lieutenant Hodgkinson has executed many sorties over enemy airfields during which he has destroyed 3 hostile aircraft and caused much disorganisation. His sterling work has contributed in a large measure to the' successes of his squadron.

— London Gazette, No. 36104, 23 July 1943

Hodgkinson and Crapper are buried at Beach Head War Cemetery, in Anzio, Italy. He is credited with having shot down twelve German aircraft, with a further aircraft considered to be probably destroyed. He also damaged five aircraft.
