= Maurice Rogers =

Recipient of the Victoria Cross

- Born: 17 July 1919; Bristol, Gloucestershire, England
- Died: 3 June 1944 (aged 24); Ardea, Italy
- Burial place: Beach Head War Cemetery, Anzio
- Military career
- Allegiance: United Kingdom
- Branch: British Army
- Rank: Sergeant
- Nickname: "Shake"
- Service number: 5568932
- Units: Wiltshire Regiment
- Conflicts: Second World War: Italian campaign; Allied invasion of Italy; Battle of Anzio †
- Awards: Victoria Cross; Military Medal

Sergeant Maurice Albert Wyndham Rogers, VC, MM (17 July 1919 – 3 June 1944) was a British Army soldier of the Second World War and a recipient of the Victoria Cross, the highest award for gallantry in the face of the enemy that can be awarded to British and Commonwealth forces.

== Details ==
Rogers was 24 years old, and a sergeant in the 2nd Battalion, Wiltshire Regiment (Duke of Edinburgh's), British Army, during the Battle of Anzio when the following deed took place, at Ardea, for which he was awarded the Victoria Cross.

The citation in the London Gazette of 8 August 1944, gives the following details:

In Italy, a battalion of the Wiltshire Regiment was ordered to attack high ground held by the enemy.

The leading Company had taken their first objective but were unable to reach their final objective, owing to heavy enemy fire and casualties. The Carrier Platoon, dismounted, were ordered to capture the final objective, supported by fire from the Company and a troop of tanks.

The objective was wired and mined and strongly defended by the enemy. The Carrier Platoon advanced through machine-gun and mortar fire until they reached the enemy's wire, which was 70 yards from their objective. At this point the Platoon was under the intense fire of seven machine-guns firing at ranges of from 50 to 100 yards, and sustained a number of casualties. The Platoon, checked by the enemy's wire and the intensity of his machine-gun fire, took cover and returned the fire preparatory to gapping the wire. Sergeant Rogers, the Platoon Sergeant, without hesitation continued to advance alone, firing his Thompson Sub-Machine Gun. He got through the enemy's wire, ran across the minefield and destroyed two of the enemy machine-gun posts with his Thompson Sub-Machine Gun and hand grenades. By now, Sergeant Rogers was 100 yards ahead of his Platoon and had penetrated 30 yards inside the enemy's defences.

He had drawn on to himself the fire of nearly all the enemy's machine-guns and had thrown their, defence into confusion.

Inspired by the example of Sergeant Rogers, the Platoon breached the enemy's wire and began the assault. Still alone and penetrating deeper into the enemy position, Sergeant Rogers, whilst attempting to silence a third machine-gun post, was blown off his feet by a grenade which burst beside him and wounded him in the leg.

Nothing daunted he stood up and still firing his Thompson Sub-Machine Gun, ran on towards the enemy post. He was shot and killed at point blank range.

This N.C.O's undaunted determination, fearless devotion to duty and superb courage carried his Platoon on to their objective in face of a determined enemy in a strongly defended position. The great gallantry and heroic self-sacrifice of Sergeant Rogers were in the highest tradition of the British Army.

== Legacy ==
In 2003 Rogers had a road named after him. A new industrial estate had been built at Hopton, Devizes, Wiltshire (near to the old Le Marchant Barracks) and the road has been called "Sgt Rogers Way". The road sign gives his full name and location and year of the VC award.

In 1947 a new housing estate, comprising two large low rise blocks of flats, in Bethnal Green east London was named 'Rogers Estate' after him. One of the blocks has a bronze plaque attached to the exterior at ground floor level commemorating this. Rogers parents were in attendance at the opening ceremony.

His story was published as the cover story for D.C. Thomson's Victor comic in issue 204 dated 16 January 1965.

In 2023 a blue plaque commemorating him was unveiled on the side of his birthplace in Redland, Bristol.

His Victoria Cross is displayed at The Rifles (Berkshire and Wiltshire) Museum in Salisbury, Wiltshire.
