= Robert T. Waugh =

- Born: January 16, 1919; Ashton, Rhode Island
- Died: May 19, 1944 (aged 25); Itri, Italy
- Burial place: Sicily-Rome American Cemetery and Memorial Nettuno, Italy
- Military career
- Allegiance: United States of America
- Branch: United States Army
- Rank: First Lieutenant
- Units: 339th Infantry Regiment, 85th Infantry Division
- Conflicts: World War II; Battle of Monte Cassino
- Awards: Medal of Honor; Purple Heart

Robert T. Waugh (January 16, 1919 – May 19, 1944) was a United States Army officer and a recipient of the United States military's highest decoration—the Medal of Honor—for his actions during the Battle of Monte Cassino in World War II.

== Biography ==
Waugh joined the Army from Augusta, Maine, and by May 11, 1944 was serving as a first lieutenant in the 339th Infantry Regiment, 85th Infantry Division. On that day, during an attack on a hill near Tremensuoli, Italy, Waugh single-handedly captured six enemy bunkers. Three days later, as the battle for the hill continued, he captured two more enemy emplacements. He was killed in action the next week and, on October 4, 1944, was posthumously awarded the Medal of Honor.

Waugh was buried at the Sicily-Rome American Cemetery and Memorial in Nettuno, Italy.

== Medal of Honor citation ==
First Lieutenant Waugh's official Medal of Honor citation reads:

For conspicuous gallantry and intrepidity at risk of life above and beyond the call of duty in action with the enemy. In the course of an attack upon an enemy-held hill on 11 May, 1st Lt. Waugh personally reconnoitered a heavily mined area before entering it with his platoon. Directing his men to deliver fire on 6 bunkers guarding this hill, 1st Lt. Waugh advanced alone against them, reached the first bunker, threw phosphorus grenades into it and as the defenders emerged, killed them with a burst from his tommygun. He repeated this process on the 5 remaining bunkers, killing or capturing the occupants. On the morning of 14 May, 1st Lt. Waugh ordered his platoon to lay a base of fire on 2 enemy pillboxes located on a knoll which commanded the only trail up the hill. He then ran to the first pillbox, threw several grenades into it, drove the defenders into the open, and killed them. The second pillbox was next taken by this intrepid officer by similar methods. The fearless actions of 1st Lt. Waugh broke the Gustav Line at that point, neutralizing 6 bunkers and 2 pillboxes and he was personally responsible for the death of 30 of the enemy and the capture of 25 others. He was later killed in action in Itri, Italy, while leading his platoon in an attack.

== See also ==
- List of Medal of Honor recipients
- List of Medal of Honor recipients for World War II
