= St. Clairsville Public Library =

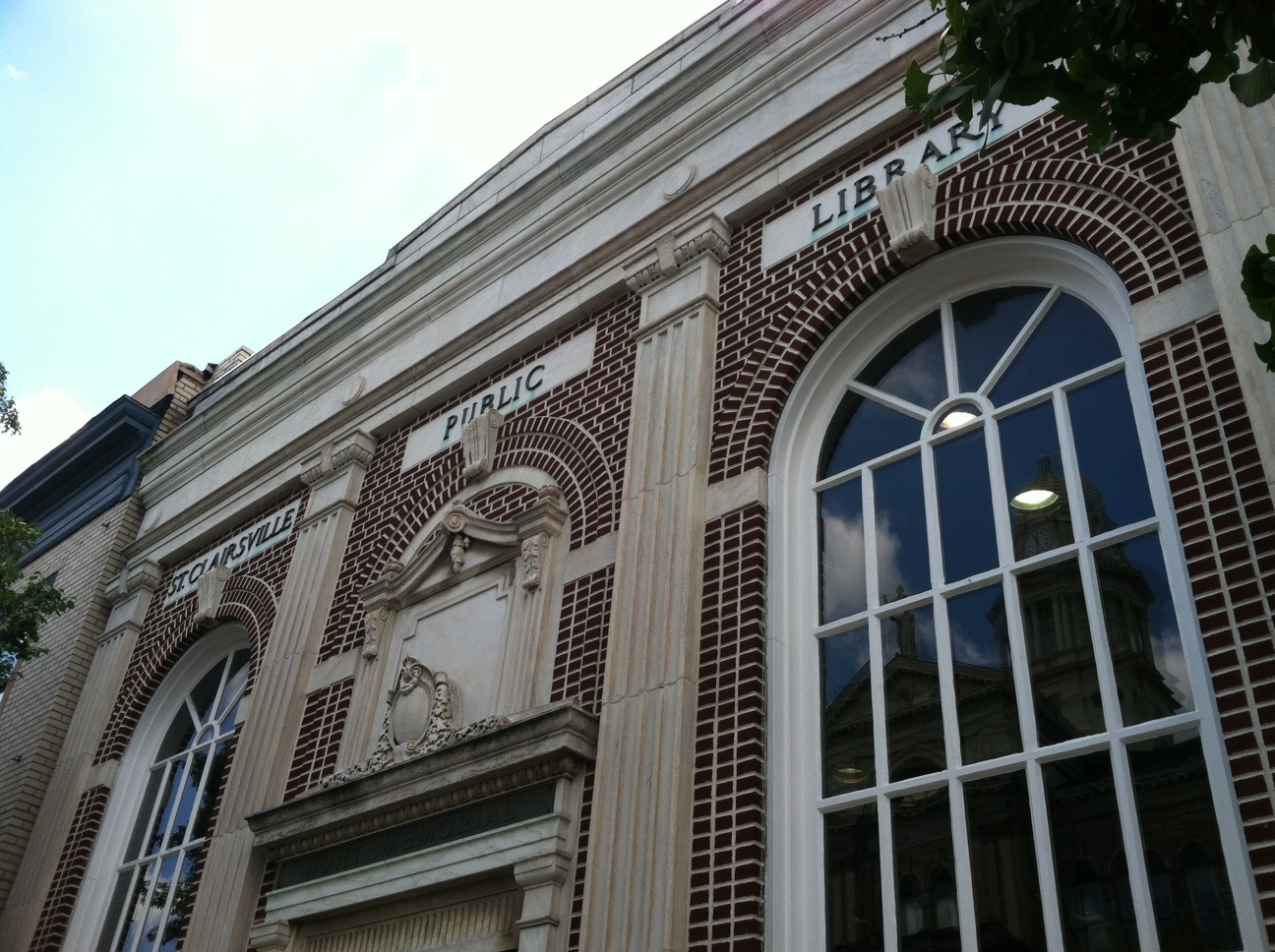
- St. Clairsville Public Library
- Interactive map of the St. Clairsville Public Library area

General information
- Architectural style: Neo-Classical Revival
- Location: St. Clairsville, Ohio, United States
- Coordinates: 40°04′49″N 80°54′04″W
- Completed: 1930

St. Clairsville Public Library is located at 108 W Main Street in St. Clairsville, Belmont County, Ohio 43950. The Library's service area includes 16,200 people, or about 25% of the population of Belmont County. St. Clairsville Public Library shares its resources as part of Serving Every Ohioan, a statewide consortium of public libraries that includes 98 member libraries.

== Programs ==
The Library offers a variety of free programs for patrons including summer reading programs, children's story times, after-school teen programs, adult crafting and educational classes, book club discussions, and technology classes. The Library actively promotes and enrolls children in Dolly Parton's Imagination Library of Ohio.

== History ==
The St. Clairsville Public Library was organized in 1938 through the efforts of many citizens and the St. Clairsville Rotary Club.

The Library had various addresses until 1955, when the Second National Bank Building was purchased and renovated as a permanent home. Dr. Bertha Hunt Schaffer made a bequest in honor of her parents, Dr. and Mrs. William Hunt, for the purchase of a building to house the Library, and on January 8, 1955, the Library dedicated the "Hunt Memorial Library Building".

Since that time there have been two additions to the building. Wilbert Allen generously contributed to combine with The Hunt Fund to make an addition in 1963; and in 1985, federal funds were secured to add to community donations, funds from the Wilbert Allen estate, and the Hunt Fund for another addition.

The Library is housed on two levels, with a multi-purpose room and offices in a third lower level. It is located on Main Street, across from the Belmont County Courthouse, and the Library is a contributing structure in the St. Clairsville Historic District.

== 2021 Statistics ==
Holdings

Books Owned	33,471
Periodical Subscriptions	41
Videos/DVD	4,012
Downloadable/Audio/Video	73,017
E-Books	882,272
Databases Available	69
Computer Software	175

Library Usage

Registered Borrowers	9,161
Total Circulation	89,063
Library Visits Per Year	51,844
Internet Uses In Library	25,317
Total Web Site Hits	48,231
Library Programs	286
Yearly Program Attendance	5,916
Yearly Reference Questions	5,720

Loan Periods & Late Fees

In 2022, the Library became "fine free." Borrowers do not pay late fees for books and videos that are checked out at the Library.

Item	Loan period
Books (Fiction & Non-Fiction)	28 days
Juvenile Books (Fiction & Non-Fiction)	28 days
New Fiction Books	28 days
New Non-Fiction Books	28 days
New Juvenile Books	28 days
Browsing Collection	28 days
Audiobooks	28 days
Music CDs	28 days
Video Games	28 days
Magazines	7 days
DVDs & Videos (Non-fiction and series are 21 days)	7 days

Most library items may be renewed up to four times unless another patron has placed a hold on an item.
