= Ohio University Eastern Campus =

- Type: Public satellite campus
- Established: 1957; 69 years ago
- Parent institution: Ohio University
- Dean: David Rohall
- Students: 516
- Location: St. Clairsville, Ohio, United States; 40°04′26″N 80°58′34″W
- Campus: Rural
- Colors: Cutler green and cupola white
- Nickname: Panthers
- Website: www.ohio.edu/eastern/

Ohio University Eastern (OUE) is a satellite campus of Ohio University in St. Clairsville, Ohio. Ohio's Eastern Campus was established in 1957.

== Campus ==
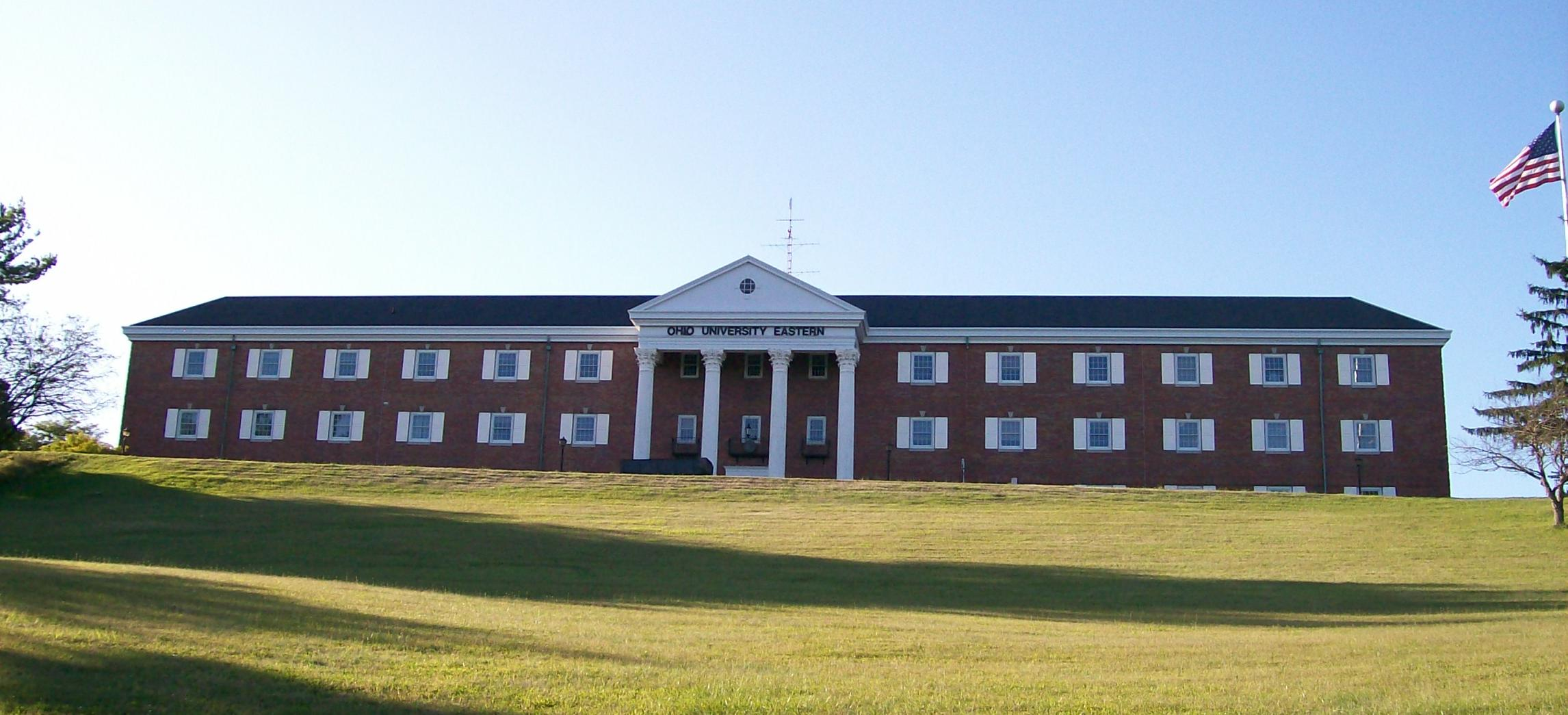
Wilson Shannon Hall

Ohio University Eastern comprises two facilities: Shannon Hall and the Health and Physical Education Center. Shannon Hall, named after Ohio's first native born governor, Wilson Shannon, is the primary educational facility on the campus. The original design of the Belmont County official seal, created by Ohio University alumnus Michael Massa, is located at the Shannon Hall entrance.

The Health and Physical Education Center (completed in 1997) is an athletic facility located between Pittsburgh, Pennsylvania and Columbus, Ohio. It serves as a community fitness center as well as the venue of the exercise physiology classrooms and labs. The center is the home to OUE's athletic programs (men's and women's basketball, volleyball, men's and women's cross country, golf) as well as the host to high school playoff contests such as the Ohio Valley Athletic Conference (OVAC) championships and the OHSAA sectional and district finals.

== Academics ==
In 2019, Eastern's campus enrolled 516 students, 149 of whom were dual-enrolled high school students. Beginning with the fall 2018 semester, Ohio University Eastern campus will offer a term-guaranteed tuition rate called the OHIO Guarantee.

Ohio University Eastern offers baccalaureate degrees in applied management, communication studies, community health services, criminal justice, early childhood education, exercise physiology, health services administration, history, middle childhood education, social work, specialized studies and technical & applied studies.

Students can begin the coursework for any of Ohio University's 250 degrees on the Eastern Campus. All of the coursework completed at OUE will be transferred to the main campus in Athens, Ohio. The average class size in Ohio University Eastern is 15.

== Athletics ==
Ohio University Eastern Campus and the four other Ohio University branch campuses dropped sports, effective the 2021 fall semester. Finances throughout Ohio University have been an issue since the outset of COVID-19 in March 2020, which forced the university to close its buildings and shift to a remote learning model. OUE sponsored men's and women's basketball, volleyball and golf as a part of the Ohio Regional Campus Conference. It also had cross country for a short period of time.

== See also ==
- Shaeffer Campbell Covered Bridge
