= USNS Sgt. Sylvester Antolak =

Cargo ship of the United States Navy

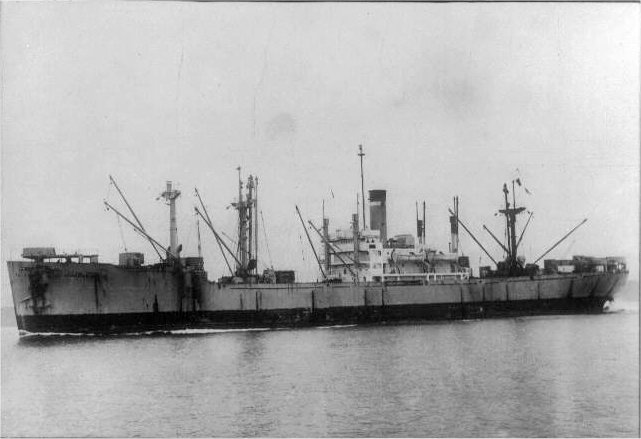
- USAT Sargent Sylvester Antolak underway, circa 1947-1949, location unknown.

History

United States
- Name: Stetson Victory; Sgt. Sylvester Antolak
- Namesake: Stetson University; Sylvester Antolak awarded the Medal of Honor
- Ordered: as type (VC2-S-AP2) hull, MCV hull 830
- Builder: Bethlehem-Fairfield Shipyard, Inc., Baltimore, Maryland
- Laid down: 3 May 1945, as SS Stetson Victory
- Launched: 16 June 1945
- Sponsored by: Mrs. Joe Hendricks
- Acquired: 18 July 1945, by the Maritime Commission
- Commissioned: 31 October 1947, as USAT Sgt. Sylvester Antolak
- Decommissioned: 31 October 1949
- Acquired: 22 July 1950, by the USN
- In service: 24 August 1950, as USNS Sgt. Sylvester Antolak (T-AP-192)
- Out of service: 17 September 1952
- Stricken: 6 November 1952
- Identification: Hull symbol:T-AP-192
- Honors and awards: 7 battle stars (Korea)
- Fate: Sold by MARAD, 8 December 1971 to West Waterway Lumber Co., Seattle, WA. for non-transportation use and scrapped

General characteristics
- Class & type: Boulder Victory-class cargo ship
- Displacement: 4,480 long tons (4,550 t) (standard); 15,580 long tons (15,830 t) (full load)
- Length: 455 ft (139 m)
- Beam: 62 ft (19 m)
- Draft: 29 ft 2 in (8.89 m)
- Installed power: 8,500 shp (6,300 kW)
- Propulsion: 1 × cross compound steam turbine; 1 × shaft
- Speed: 16 kn (18 mph; 30 km/h)
- Troops: 1,070
- Complement: 112 officers and enlisted
- Armament: none

USNS Sgt. Sylvester Antolak (AP-192/T-AP-192) was a Boulder Victory-class cargo ship that served as a United States Army Transport, and in the United States Navy's Military Sea Transportation Service, in the post-World War II period.

The ship was a VC2-S-AP-2 type Victory ship built under a Maritime Commission contract (MCV hull 830). Laid down as the Stetson Victory on 3 May 1945 by the Bethlehem-Fairfield Shipyard, Inc., Baltimore, Maryland, and launched on 16 June 1945; sponsored by Mrs. Joe Hendricks; and delivered to the Maritime Commission's War Shipping Administration on 18 July 1945 for operation by Isbrandtsen Co., Inc.

== Service history ==
=== US Army service ===
After operating under government contract for a year, Stetson Victory was returned to the War Shipping Administration in July 1946, and was transferred to the War Department for operation by the Army. Renamed USAT Sgt. Sylvester Antolak on 31 October 1947, the ship carried Army passengers and cargo across the globe. On 2 December 1948, the troop transport left Yokohama, Japan, with over 1,000 officers and enlisted men of 317th Troop Carrier Wing (Heavy) embarked. After a 40-day voyage the ship arrived in Bremerhaven, Germany, on 9 January 1949, delivering the personnel in support of the Berlin Airlift. The transport was then returned to the Maritime Commission for berthing at Suisun Bay, California, in the National Defense Reserve Fleet.

=== Korean War ===
On 22 July 1950, shortly after the start of the Korean War, she was reactivated by the Navy for operation by the Military Sea Transportation Service. Following minor alterations, including the addition of limited medical spaces, USNS Sgt. Sylvester Antolak (T-AP-192) sailed from San Francisco on 24 August to transport troops to Yokohama, Japan. She remained in the western Pacific, shuttling troops from Japan, as well as the Philippine Expeditionary Forces To Korea (PEFTOK), into June 1951; then returned to the United States to embark more soldiers for transportation to the Far East. She continued to carry American troops on trans-Pacific voyages and shuttle runs between Japanese ports and between Japan and Korea until April 1952. She then operated briefly along the east coast of the United States and in the Caribbean until June, when she retransited the Panama Canal to resume operations in the Pacific. By the end of July, she had conducted a round-trip run to Bangkok out of Sasebo and was en route to the Aleutian Islands, whence she returned to the west coast for inactivation.

Sgt. Sylvester Antolak arrived at Seattle on 10 August and was returned to the Maritime Administration on 17 September for berthing in the National Defense Reserve Fleet. Her name was struck from the Navy List on 6 November 1952. In December 1971, Sgt. Sylvester Antolak was sold for scrap by the Maritime Administration.
