= Ohio University – Zanesville =

Satellite campus of Ohio University

Coordinates: 39°57′45″N 82°2′0″W

Ohio University Zanesville
- Type: Public satellite campus
- Established: 1946; 80 years ago
- Parent institution: Ohio University
- Dean: Hannah Nissen
- Students: 1,898
- Location: Zanesville, Ohio, United States
- Colors: Cutler green and cupola white
- Nickname: Tracers
- Website: www.ohio.edu/zanesville/

Ohio University Zanesville (OU Zanesville) is a satellite campus of Ohio University in Zanesville, Ohio. It was founded in 1946 and serves commuter students who seek associate degrees, bachelor's degrees, community education, or business and industry training. The campus practices open admissions.

With 85 faculty and staff, Ohio University Zanesville provides academic advising, tutoring, and specialized testing services. Campus facilities include wireless internet access, a cafeteria, a coffee café, bookstore, a 30,000 volume library with electronic databases and resources, the Collegial Woods network of walking trails and the Muskingum Recreation Center.

== Campus ==
The 179-acre campus of Ohio University and Zane State College is made up of seven buildings including Elson Hall, Herrold Hall, the Cora E. Rogge Pavilion, and Littick Hall (Ohio University); College Hall, Health Science Hall, Campus Center and Advanced Science & Technology Center (Zane State College); and the Muskingum Recreation Center.

Elson Hall, the first building on the Ohio University Zanesville campus was built in 1967. It is the primary location for classrooms and offices for the Zanesville Campus. The Zanesville Campus Library serves both Ohio University Zanesville and Zane State College. It has been a co-located library since the 1970s. The library also features the Zanesville Heritage Collection.

== Academics ==
Ohio University Zanesville offers 13 bachelor's degree programs and 5 associate degree programs. Ohio University Zanesville also offers future and current students classes being viewed over the Ohio University Learning Network program (OULN). The program enables regional campus students to get degrees that are offered in Athens at Ohio University.

== Student life ==
Active student groups include Communication club Student Senate, Students Nurses Association of Zanesville (SNAZ), the Green Bobcats (Environmental/Sustainability Club), Electronic Media Club, Future Educators of Ohio University Zanesville (FEOUZ), Psi Beta Psychology Honor Society, Sports & Recreation Club, Rotaract, intramural sports and cultural activities.

== Athletics ==
During the COVID pandemic, Ohio University Zanesville and the four other Ohio University branch campuses dropped sports, effective the 2021 fall semester. Ohio University Zanesville was part of the Ohio Regional Campus Conference and sports programs offered previously included baseball, men's and women's basketball, golf, women's softball, and women's volleyball. The school mascot is a Tracer, a hunting dog.
