= St. Clairsville, Ohio =

City in Ohio, US

- City
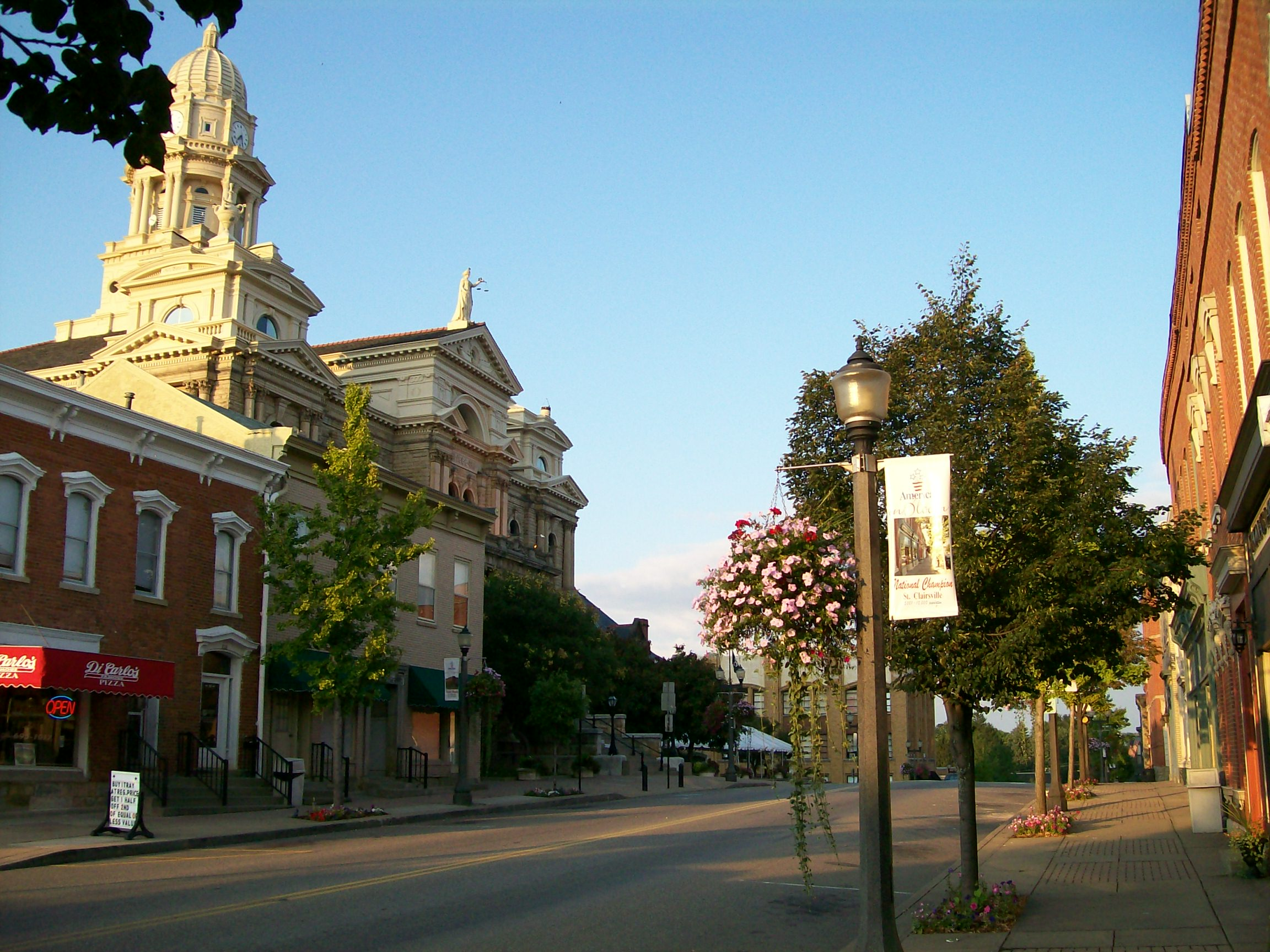
- Downtown St. Clairsville

- Logo
- Nickname: Paradise On The Hilltop
- Interactive map of St. Clairsville, Ohio
- Location within Ohio Location within the United States
- Coordinates: 40°04′45″N 80°53′59″W
- Country: United States
- State: Ohio
- County: Belmont
- Township: Richland

Area
  - Total: 2.44 sq mi (6.32 km^{2})
  - Land: 2.42 sq mi (6.27 km^{2})
  - Water: 0.019 sq mi (0.05 km^{2})
- Elevation: 1,224 ft (373 m)

Population (2020)
  - Total: 5,096
  - Density: 2,103.7/sq mi (812.24/km^{2})
- Time zone: UTC-5 (Eastern (EST))
  - Summer (DST): UTC-4 (EDT)
- ZIP code: 43950
- Area code(s): 740 & 220
- FIPS code: 39-69526
- GNIS feature ID: 2396482
- Website: www.stclairsville.com

St. Clairsville or Saint Clairsville is a city in Belmont County, Ohio, United States, and its county seat. The population was 5,096 at the 2020 census. It is part of the Wheeling metropolitan area.

== History ==
The seat of justice of Belmont County was originally known as Newellstown, and under the latter name was laid out in the late 1790s by David Newell. The name of the settlement was soon changed to St. Clairsville in honor of Northwest Territory Governor and Revolutionary War Major-General Arthur St. Clair.

In 1833, St. Clairsville was the first notable town west of Wheeling on the National Road: it contained a brick courthouse and jail, five houses of worship, seventeen or eighteen mercantile stores, several groceries, a drug store, a book store, five taverns, three printing offices, four or five physicians, fourteen or fifteen lawyers, and a large number of mechanics' shops. Charles Kuralt's "On the Road" segment of CBS Evening News drove through St. Clairsville for a TV segment in the 1960s.

== Geography ==
According to the United States Census Bureau, the city has a total area of 2.44 square miles (6.32 km^{2}), of which 2.42 square miles (6.27 km^{2}) is land and 0.02 square miles (0.05 km^{2}) is water. The Official Belmont County Seal, designed by county native Michael A. Massa, features 13 stars, denoting that the county was the 13th parcel to have originally been incorporated into what was the US Northwest Territory.

== Demographics ==
Historical population
Census	Pop.	Note	%±
1810	431		—
1820	641		48.7%
1830	789		23.1%
1840	829		5.1%
1850	1,025		23.6%
1860	999		−2.5%
1870	1,056		5.7%
1880	1,128		6.8%
1890	1,191		5.6%
1900	1,210		1.6%
1910	1,393		15.1%
1920	1,561		12.1%
1930	2,440		56.3%
1940	2,797		14.6%
1950	3,040		8.7%
1960	3,865		27.1%
1970	4,754		23.0%
1980	5,452		14.7%
1990	5,162		−5.3%
2000	5,057		−2.0%
2010	5,184		2.5%
2020	5,096		−1.7%
2025 (est.)	4,926		−3.3%

=== 2020 census ===
As of the 2020 census, St. Clairsville had a population of 5,096, and the median age was 49.3 years; 18.5% of residents were under the age of 18 and 30.9% were 65 years of age or older. For every 100 females there were 87.6 males, and for every 100 females age 18 and over there were 85.4 males age 18 and over.

Approximately 99.6% of residents lived in urban areas, while 0.4% lived in rural areas.

There were 2,223 households in St. Clairsville, of which 22.4% had children under the age of 18 living in them. Of all households, 44.8% were married-couple households, 19.2% were households with a male householder and no spouse or partner present, and 31.0% were households with a female householder and no spouse or partner present. About 37.5% of all households were made up of individuals and 20.6% had someone living alone who was 65 years of age or older.

There were 2,537 housing units, of which 12.4% were vacant. The homeowner vacancy rate was 2.0% and the rental vacancy rate was 16.8%.

Racial composition as of the 2020 census
Race	Number	Percent
White	4,624	90.7%
Black or African American	116	2.3%
American Indian and Alaska Native	4	0.1%
Asian	85	1.7%
Native Hawaiian and Other Pacific Islander	1	0.0%
Some other race	44	0.9%
Two or more races	222	4.4%
Hispanic or Latino (of any race)	118	2.3%

=== 2010 census ===
As of the census of 2010, there were 5,184 people, 2,386 households, and 1,407 families living in the city. The population density was 2,142.1 inhabitants per square mile (827.1/km^{2}). There were 2,531 housing units at an average density of 1,045.9 per square mile (403.8/km^{2}). The racial makeup of the city was 94.7% White, 2.8% African American, 0.1% Native American, 1.0% Asian, 0.3% from other races, and 1.2% from two or more races. Hispanic or Latino of any race were 0.7% of the population.

There were 2,386 households, of which 22.2% had children under the age of 18 living with them, 46.4% were married couples living together, 9.5% had a female householder with no husband present, 3.1% had a male householder with no wife present, and 41.0% were non-families. 37.3% of all households were made up of individuals, and 20.4% had someone living alone who was 65 years of age or older. The average household size was 2.10 and the average family size was 2.74.

The median age in the city was 49.7 years. 17.7% of residents were under the age of 18; 6.1% were between the ages of 18 and 24; 20.2% were from 25 to 44; 30.1% were from 45 to 64; and 25.8% were 65 years of age or older. The gender makeup of the city was 45.9% male and 54.1% female.

=== 2000 census ===
As of the census of 2000, there were 5,057 people, 2,262 households, and 1,431 families living in the city. The population density was 2,354.2 inhabitants per square mile (909.0/km^{2}). There were 2,430 housing units at an average density of 1,131.2 per square mile (436.8/km^{2}). The racial makeup of the city was 94.48% White, 3.08% African American, 0.04% Native American, 1.36% Asian, 0.04% Pacific Islander, 0.16% from other races, and 0.83% from two or more races. Hispanic or Latino of any race were 0.47% of the population.

There were 2,262 households, out of which 24.8% had children under the age of 18 living with them, 52.8% were married couples living together, 8.0% had a female householder with no husband present, and 36.7% were non-families. 33.7% of all households were made up of individuals, and 18.4% had someone living alone who was 65 years of age or older. The average household size was 2.18 and the average family size was 2.78.

In the city the population was spread out, with 19.8% under the age of 18, 5.6% from 18 to 24, 23.1% from 25 to 44, 27.6% from 45 to 64, and 23.9% who were 65 years of age or older. The median age was 46 years. For every 100 females, there were 82.9 males. For every 100 females age 18 and over, there were 78.0 males.

The median income for a household in the city was $36,630, and the median income for a family was $47,808. Males had a median income of $40,597 versus $25,229 for females. The per capita income for the city was $23,416. About 4.2% of families and 6.7% of the population were below the poverty line, including 11.0% of those under age 18 and 5.4% of those age 65 or over.

== Attractions and economy ==
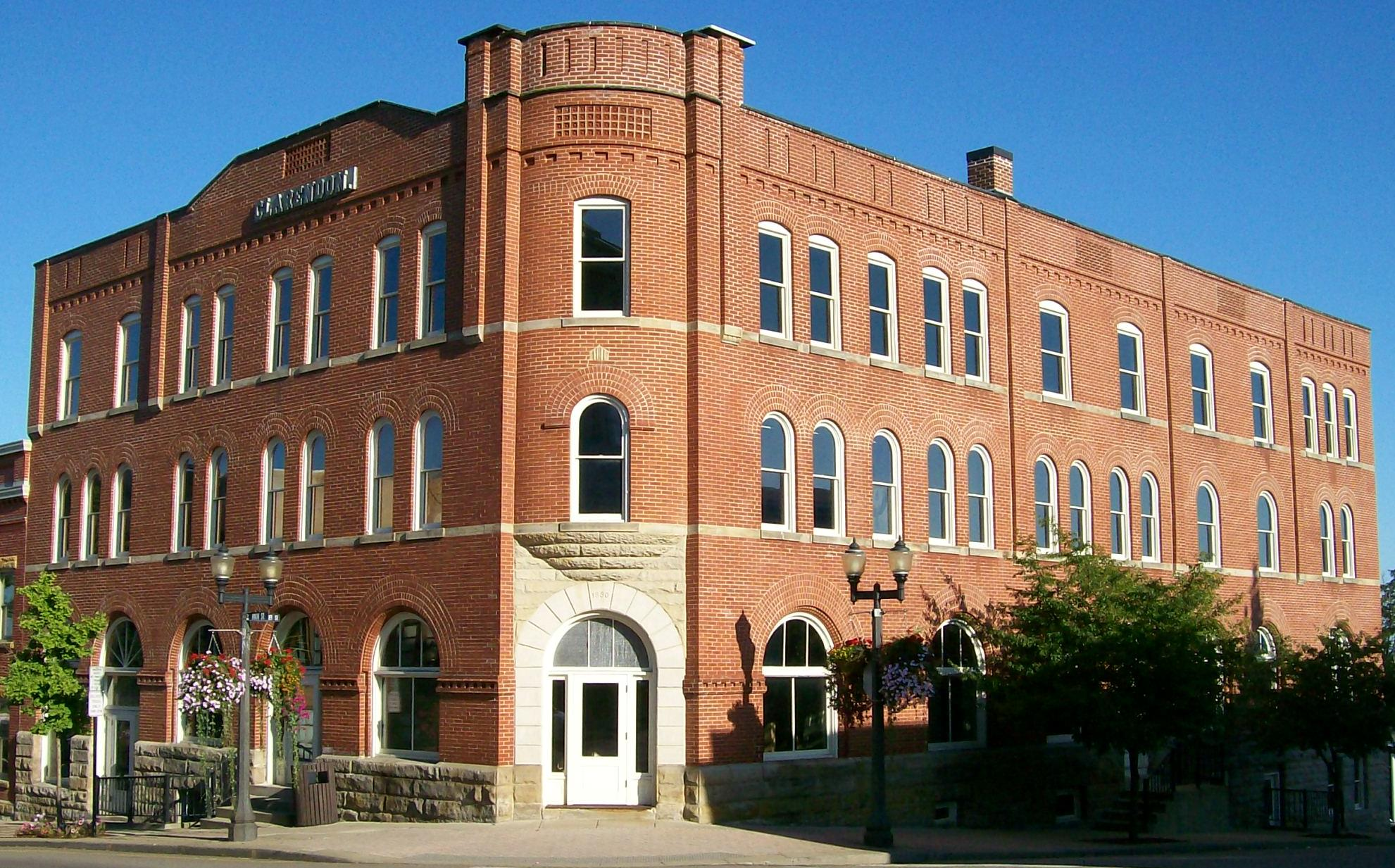
The Clarendon Hotel

The Clarendon Hotel, built in 1890, has been renovated into an extended-stay hotel. It lies along the National Road, a National Scenic Byway.

Murray Energy is based in St. Clairsville.

== Arts and culture ==
The main shopping district is centered on the Ohio Valley Mall, which opened in 1978.

Another popular location in St. Clairsville is a bicycle path that runs approximately 2.5 miles (4.0 km) from the entrance to the Saginaw Mine to the Junior Sports complex. The Bike Path features a gazebo, two nature trails, two tunnels, a Wheeling & Lake Erie original railroad bridge, and countless scouts projects. The National Road Bikeway in St. Clairsville is the only bike trail in Ohio with a rail tunnel.

== Education ==
The St. Clairsville school system serves students in grades pre-kindergarten to twelve at St. Clairsville High School, Middle School, and Elementary School. The St. Clairsville mascot is a Red Devil, deriving from a nickname for local coal miners. The miners would emerge covered in red dust because of the red clay present at a local mine in an area dubbed Hell's Kitchen.

Located in the city is St. Mary's School which includes grades pre-kindergarten through eight. Their mascot is the Knights. St. Mary's School was a feeder school into St. John Central Academy in Bellaire, Ohio. The school is of the Roman Catholic affiliation.

Higher education includes Belmont College and the Ohio University Eastern Campus.

== Transportation ==
St. Clairsville lays along both Interstate 70 and U.S. Route 40 (the latter of which runs roughly parallel to the former National Road). The town is also served by Ohio State Route 9, and Interstate 470 has its western terminus nearby.

St. Clairsville is home to Alderman Airport, a private airport. The nearest general aviation airport is Wheeling Ohio County Airport, and the nearest major commercial airport is Pittsburgh International Airport.

== Notable people ==
- Sylvester Antolak - Medal of Honor recipient
- Alice A. W. Cadwallader – philanthropist and temperance activist
- James E. Carnes - Former Ohio State Senator
- Thomas Eckert - Assistant Secretary of War from 1865–1869
- John Jacob Lentz - founder of the American Insurance Union and former member of Congress
- Benjamin Lundy - Quaker anti-slavery leader
- Edmund A. Sargus, Jr. - U. S. Federal Judge on the United States District Court for the Southern District of Ohio
- Jeremy Sowers - starting pitcher for the Cleveland Indians
- Tim Spencer - Ohio State running back, coach, member of San Diego Chargers
- Charlie Wilson - former U.S. Representative from Ohio's 6th Congressional District

== See also ==
- St. Clairsville Public Library
