= Wayne College =

Public satellite college in Orrville, Ohio, US

Coordinates: 40°51′42″N 81°47′25″W

The University of Akron Wayne College
- Former names: Wayne General & Technical College (1972-1990)
- Type: Public satellite campus
- Established: 1972; 54 years ago
- Parent institution: University of Akron
- Director: Heather Howley
- Faculty: 20
- Students: 1,475
- Location: Orrville, Ohio, United States
- Campus: 160 acres (65 ha), suburban
- Colors: Blue and Gold
- Nickname: Warriors
- Sporting affiliations: ORCC
- Website: wayne.uakron.edu

Wayne College is a satellite campus of the University of Akron in Orrville, Ohio, United States. It offers the first two years of general bachelor's degree coursework for students who plan to complete their degrees at the Akron campus or other colleges and universities. The college also offers two bachelor's programs including organizational supervision and social work. An MBA is also available at the campus through The University of Akron College of Business Administration.

== History and mission ==
Founded in 1972, Wayne College is the only regional branch of the University of Akron and is authorized by the State of Ohio through the Ohio State Board of Regents to offer general education, including associate's degrees and baccalaureate-oriented preparation and degrees; technical education programs; Post Secondary Enrollment Options for high school juniors and seniors; and continuing education experiences for those who live in the College's service area of Wayne, Medina and Holmes counties.

== Facilities ==
Wayne College is located on 160 acres of land on the northern edge of Orrville, Ohio and consists of the original classroom building built in 1972 and the Student Life Building, which opened in 2009. The SLB is the marquis of the campus with amenities for students as well as the community including classroom space, a banquet hall, an art gallery, plus a Barnes and Noble bookstore, a cafe, and recreational space. The building also houses the Continuing Education & Workforce Development department. The campus includes the Barnet-Hoover Farmhouse, the original homestead of the property circa 1818. In 2005 the building was re-adapted for classroom use and now modern conveniences, while still maintaining its historic feel.

== Athletics ==
Athletics at UA Wayne College consists of one athletic director, 4 head coaches and approximately 40 student-athletes. Sport programs include: men’s and women’s basketball, men’s golf, and women’s volleyball, which compete in the Ohio Regional Campus Conference (ORCC). All home volleyball and basketball games are held in the John E. Boyer Center. All home golf matches are held at The Pines Golf Club.

== Faculty ==
Wayne College has 27 full-time faculty, 14 of whom hold doctorate degrees. The average full-time faculty member has a master's degree plus 20 semester hours of additional coursework and 12 years of teaching experience. The student-to-faculty ratio is 23 to 1 with an average class size of 18 students.

== Enrollment ==
Wayne College enrolls nearly 1,500 students each semester for credit classes with another 2,500 participating in some manner of continuing education and/or workforce development training. Of those students, 70% come from Wayne County, 20% from Medina County, with the remaining 10% from Holmes and other counties. Wayne College offers day and evening classes, plus special sections for Weekend College. In 2019, over half of Wayne College students were dual-enrolled high school students.
