= Sylvester Antolak =

United States Army Medal of Honor recipient (1918-1944)

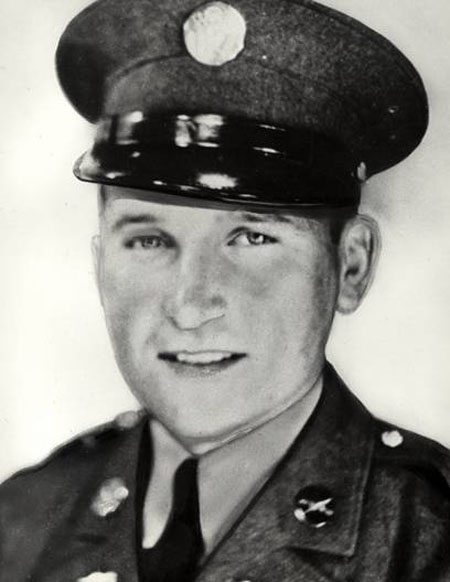
- Born: September 10, 1918; Fairpoint, Ohio
- Died: May 24, 1944 (aged 25); Cisterna di Littoria, Italy
- Burial place: Sicily–Rome American Cemetery and Memorial
- Military career
- Allegiance: United States of America
- Branch: United States Army
- Service years: 1941–1944
- Rank: Sergeant
- Units: Company B, 15th Infantry Regiment, 3rd Infantry Division
- Conflicts: World War II: Italian Campaign †
- Awards: Medal of Honor; Purple Heart

Sylvester Antolak (September 10, 1918 – May 24, 1944) was a United States Army Sergeant who posthumously received the Medal of Honor for his actions on May 24, 1944.

== Biography ==
Sylvester Antolak was an American of Polish descent. He joined the army from his hometown of St. Clairsville, Ohio on July 14, 1941. During the Allied invasion of Italy, Sergeant Antolak fought relentlessly to overtake German defenses near Cisterna di Littoria. Despite being shot three times and suffering a broken arm, he continued to push towards a Wehrmacht machine gun nest before being shot and killed. Antolak’s men, observing his determination, subsequently overtook the enemy position.

== To Hell And Back ==
In his book, To Hell And Back, fellow Medal of Honor recipient Audie L. Murphy refers to Antolak as "Lutsky" and provides the following account of his heroism:

"We roll over the wall and find ourselves in the range of two enemy strong points. But for the moment, the krauts are ignoring us. They are absorbed in trying to split the two groups of men that preceded us.

A sergeant in the first platoon senses the predicament. If his men are isolated, they will likely be destroyed. He makes his decision quickly. Motioning his men to follow, he rises and with a submachine gun charges head-on toward one of the enemy positions two hundred yards away.

On the flat, coverless terrain, his body is a perfect target. A blast of automatic fire knocks him down. He springs to his feet with a bleeding shoulder and continues his charge. The guns rattle. Again he goes down.

Fascinated, we watch as he gets up for the third time and dashes straight into the enemy fire. The Germans throw everything they have at him. He falls to the earth; and when he again pulls himself to his feet, we see that his right arm is shattered. But wedging his gun under his left armpit, he continues firing and staggers forward. Ten horrified Germans throw down their guns and yell "Kamerad".

That is all I see. But later I learn that the sergeant, ignoring the pleas of his men to get under cover and wait for medical attention, charged the second enemy strongpoint. By sheer guts, he advanced sixty yards before being stopped by a final concentration of enemy fire. He reeled, then tottered forward another few yards before falling.

Inspired by his valor and half-insane with rage, his men took over, stormed the kraut emplacement, and captured it. When they returned to their leader, he was dead.

This was how Lutsky, the sergeant, helped buy the freedom that we cherish and abuse."

== Awards and decorations ==
=== Medal of Honor ===
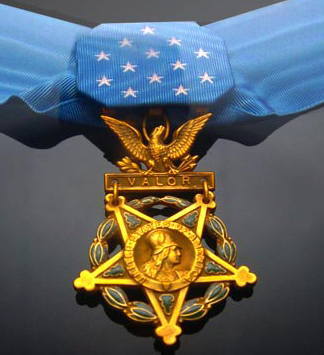

Sylvester Antolak
Rank and organization: Sergeant, U.S. Army, Company B, 1st Battalion, 15th Infantry Regiment, 3rd Infantry Division
Place and date: near Cisterna di Littoria, Italy, 24 May 1944
Awarded for actions during: World War II
Born: September 10, 1916, Fairpoint, Ohio
Died: Cisterna di Littoria, Italy, 24 May 1944
G.O. No.: 89 (October 19, 1945)

Citation:

The President of the United States of America, in the name of Congress, takes pride in presenting the Medal of Honor (Posthumously) to Sergeant Sylvester Antolak (ASN: 35035020), United States Army, for conspicuous gallantry and intrepidity in action above and beyond the call of duty on 24 May 1944, while serving with Company B, 1st Battalion, 15th Infantry Regiment, 3d Infantry Division, near Cisterna di Littoria, Italy. Sergeant Antolak charged 200 yards over flat, coverless terrain to destroy an enemy machinegun nest during the second day of the offensive which broke through the German cordon of steel around the Anzio beachhead. Fully 30 yards in advance of his squad, he ran into withering enemy machinegun, machine-pistol and rifle fire. Three times he was struck by bullets and knocked to the ground, but each time he struggled to his feet to continue his relentless advance. With one shoulder deeply gashed and his right arm shattered, he continued to rush directly into the enemy fire concentration with his submachine gun wedged under his uninjured arm until within 15 yards of the enemy strong point, where he opened fire at deadly close range, killing two Germans and forcing the remaining ten to surrender. He reorganized his men and, refusing to seek medical attention so badly needed, chose to lead the way toward another strong point 100 yards distant. Utterly disregarding the hail of bullets concentrated upon him, he had stormed ahead nearly three-fourths of the space between strong points when he was instantly killed by hostile enemy fire. Inspired by his example, his squad went on to overwhelm the enemy troops. By his supreme sacrifice, superb fighting courage, and heroic devotion to the attack, Sergeant Antolak was directly responsible for eliminating 20 Germans, capturing an enemy machinegun, and clearing the path for his company to advance.

=== Commendations ===
SGT Antolak's awards include the following:

| Badge | Combat Infantryman Badge | | |
| 1st row | Medal of Honor | Purple Heart | Army Good Conduct Medal |
| 2nd row | American Campaign Medal | European-African-Middle Eastern Campaign Medal with Arrowhead device and 3 bronze Campaign stars | World War II Victory Medal |

== Legacy ==
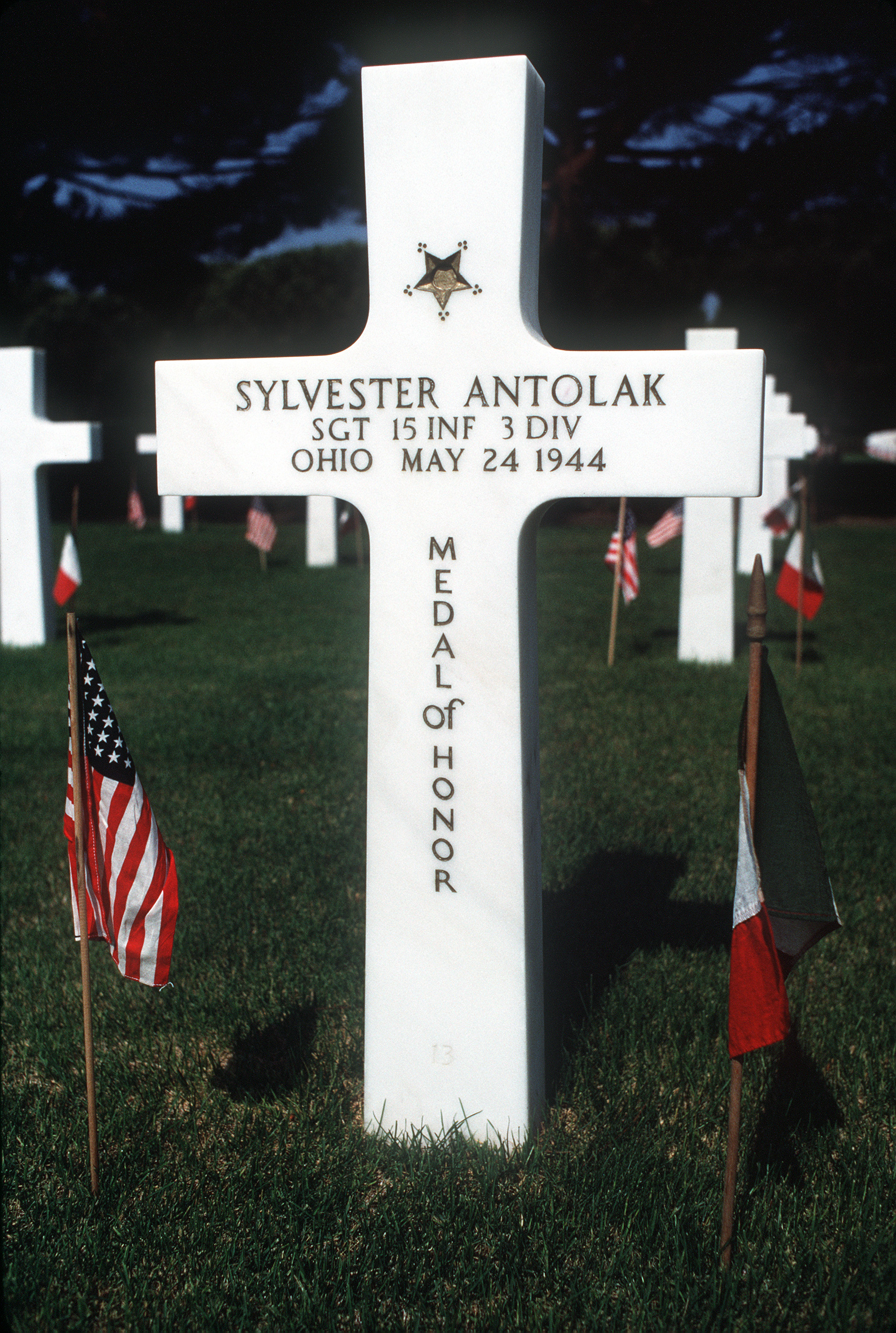
Antolak's grave at the Sicily Rome American Cemetery

- The USNS Sgt. Sylvester Antolak (T-AP-192) was named after Sgt. Sylvester Antolak.
- In 2017, a section of Interstate 70 that runs through Belmont County, Ohio near Sgt. Antolak's hometown of St. Clairsville was renamed the "Sgt. Sylvester Antolak Highway." The section of Interstate 70 that is named the Sgt. Sylvester Antolak Highway actually is located on the property where the Antolak family home was located.
- The first episode of the 2018 Netflix series Medal of Honor features Sgt. Antolak, played by actor Joseph Cross.
- In 2009, Antolak's grandnephew, Cole Antolak, dedicated his Eagle Scout project to developing a monument honoring his granduncle. It is located in St. Clairesville, Ohio in Belmont County.

== Death ==
Sylvester Antolak was killed in action on May 24, 1944. He is buried at Sicily-Rome American Cemetery and Memorial, Plot C, Row 12, Grave 13.

== See also ==
- List of Medal of Honor recipients
- List of Medal of Honor recipients for World War II
