= Sicily–Rome American Cemetery and Memorial =

American military cemetery in Italy

- American Battle Monuments Commission
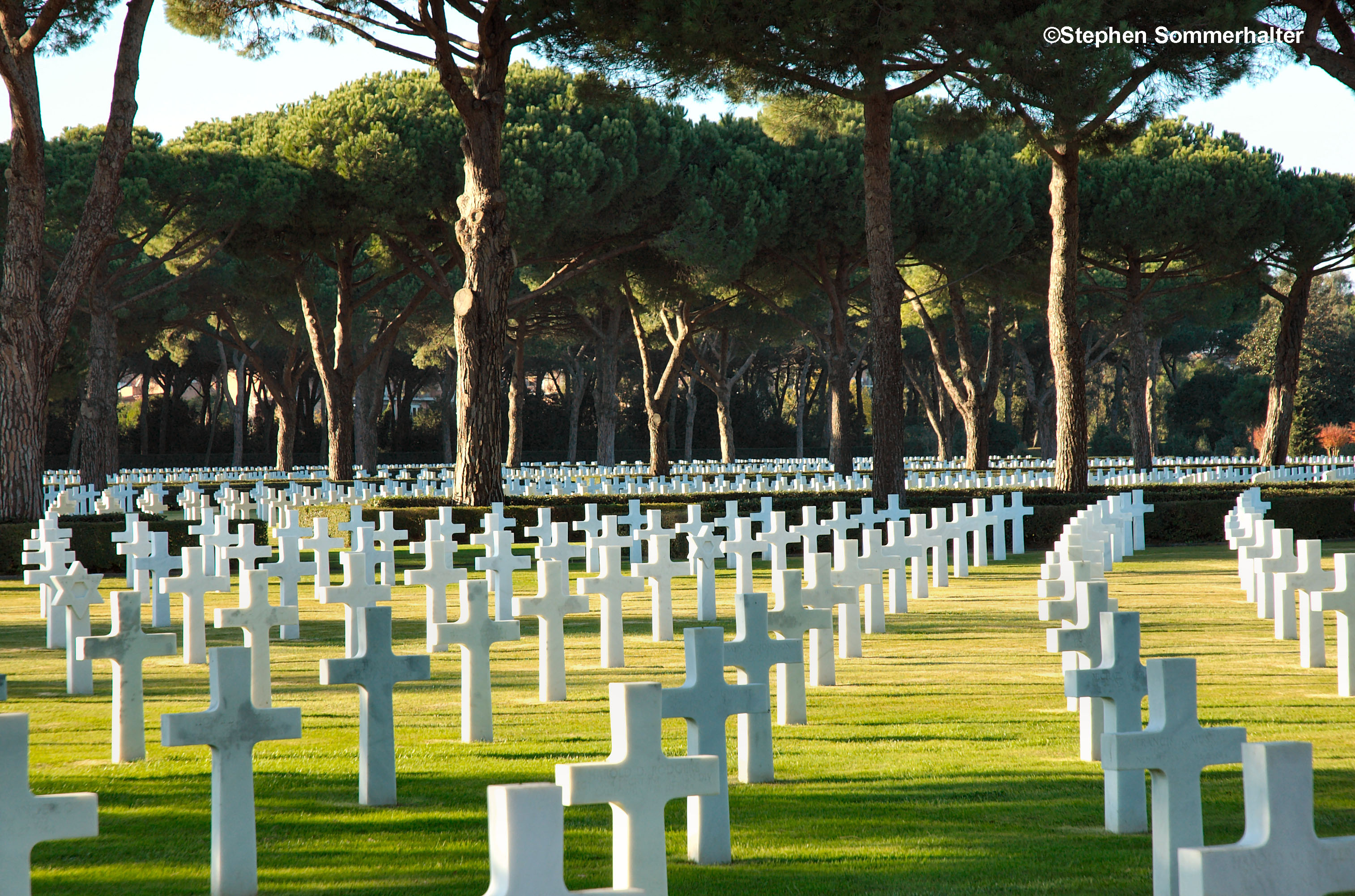
- Headstones at the cemetery
- For American casualties of World War II
- Established: 24 January 1944
- Dedicated: 1956
- Location: 41°27′55″N 12°39′30″E near Nettuno, Lazio, Italy
- Designed by: Murphy & Locraft (monument); Allyn R. Jennings (landscaping)
- Total burials: 7,858

Sicily–Rome American Cemetery and Memorial is a World War II American military war grave cemetery, located in Nettuno, near Anzio, Italy. The cemetery, containing 7,858 American war dead, covers 77 acres (31 ha) and was dedicated in 1956. It is administered by the American Battle Monuments Commission.

== History and design ==
The cemetery was established in Nettuno, as a temporary battlefield cemetery on 24 January 1944, two days after Operation Shingle began, the Allied landings at Anzio and Nettuno on mainland Italy.

The majority of burials at the cemetery are of men that died fighting in the liberation of Sicily, code-named Operation Husky (10 July to 17 August 1943); in the landings at the Salerno, code-named Operation Avalanche (9 September 1943) and the heavy fighting northward; and the landings, code-named Operation Shingle, at Anzio and Nettuno and expansion of the beachhead (22 January 1944 to May 1944); and in air and naval support in the regions.

== Layout ==
The cemetery covers 77 acres (31 ha) with a gentle slope rising from a pool with an island and cenotaph flanked by groups of Italian cypress trees. Beyond the pool is the immense field of headstones of 7,861 of American military war dead, arranged in gentle arcs on broad green lawns beneath rows of pine trees.

A wide central mall leads to the memorial, rich in works of art and architecture, expressing America's and Italy's remembrance of the dead. It consists of a chapel to the south, a peristyle, and a map room to the north. On the white marble walls of the chapel are engraved the names of 3,095 of the missing. Rosettes mark the names of those since recovered and identified. The map room contains a bronze relief map and four fresco maps depicting the military operations in Sicily and Italy. At each end of the memorial are ornamental Italian gardens.

There is a wall of remembrance commemorating 3.095 missing in action service personnel (rosettes denote those later found or identified).

In May 2014, a visitors' center was opened. The center displays photographs, films, and displays of the Allied advance in Sicily and Italy as well as personal stories of those involved.

== Notable burials ==
- Medal of Honor recipients
  - Sylvester Antolak (1916–1944 †), for action at the Anzio Beachhead
  - Robert T. Waugh (1919–1944 †), for action at the Gustav Line in Lazio, Italy
- Others
  - Henry T. Waskow (1918-1943 †), killed at the Battle of San Pietro.
  - Max Brand (1892–1944 †}, war correspondent and author, killed at Lazio, Italy
  - Allen Tupper Brown (1916–1944 †), killed near Campoleone. Brown was the stepson of U.S. Army Chief of Staff General George C. Marshall.

== Papal commemoration ==
Pope Francis visited the cemetery on All Soul's Day, Thursday, 2 November 2017, in a brief papal visit to the area for the commemoration, where he toured the cemetery grounds and placed flowers on some grave headstones, including an unknown soldier, and Italian-American soldier, and a Jewish soldier. Afterwards, in purple, as is custom for the day, he celebrated Mass and preached a homily at the cemetery. Following the visit there, he moved on to the site of the Ardeatine massacre, named for the forested area in which it took place.

== See also ==
- List of cemeteries in Italy
- List of national cemeteries by country
- Military history of Italy during World War II
- Military history of the United States during World War II
