= Anzio =

Anzio Porto d'Anzio
- Comune
- Città di Anzio
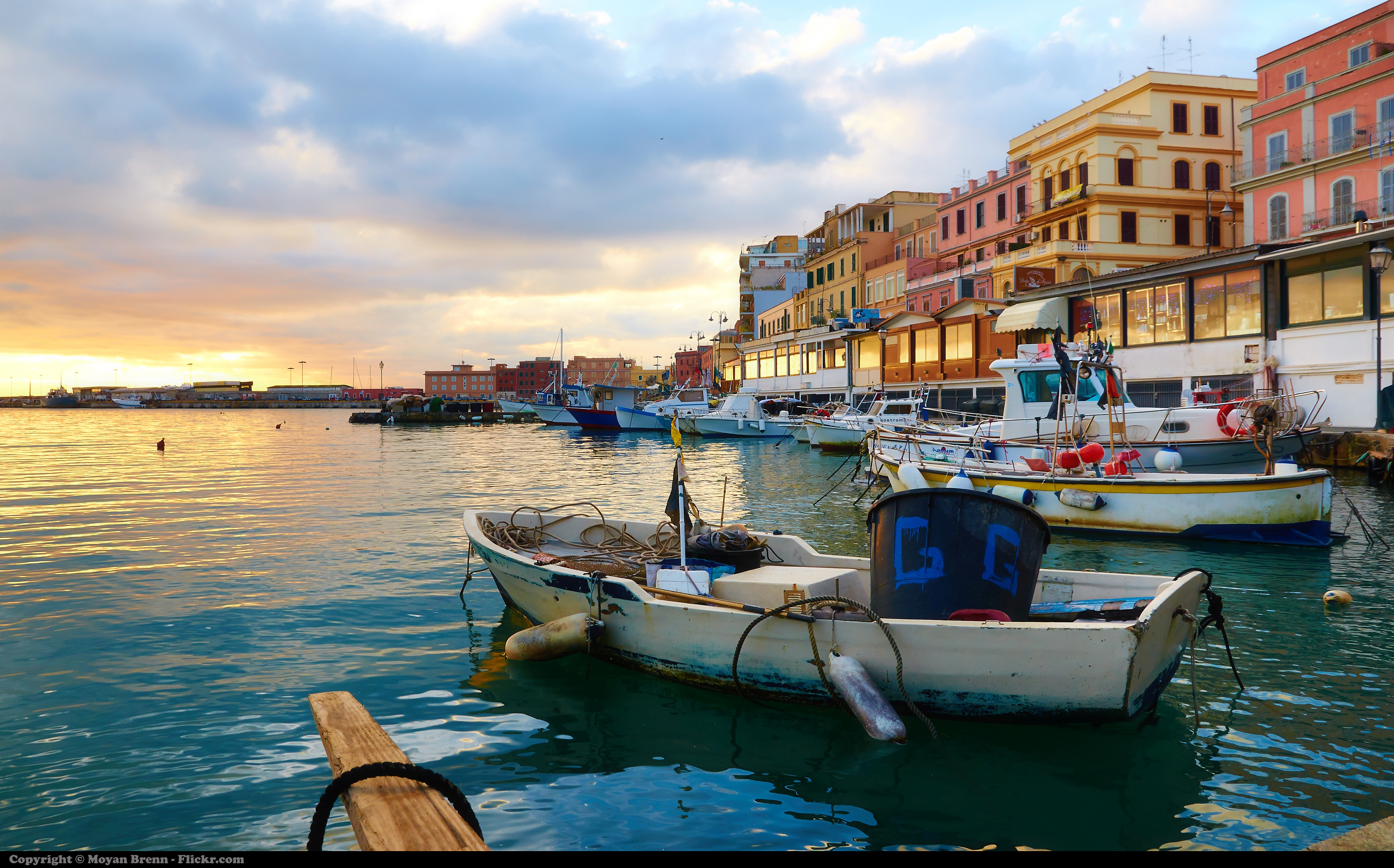
- View of Anzio

- Flag Coat of arms
- Motto: Latin: O diva gratum quae regis Antium; English: O goddess (Fortune), who rules your beloved Antium
- Location within Italy Location within Lazio
- Coordinates: 41°26′52.61″N 12°37′44.59″E
- Country: Italy
- Region: Lazio
- Metropolitan city: Rome (RM)
- Frazioni: Anzio Colonia, Cincinnato, Falasche, Lavinio Mare, Lavinio Stazione, Lido dei Gigli, Lido dei Pini, Lido delle Sirene, Marechiaro, Villa Claudia, Santa Teresa

Government
  - Mayor: Aurelio Lo Fazio (PD)

Area
  - Total: 43.43 km^{2} (16.77 sq mi)
- Elevation: 3 m (9.8 ft)

Population (30 April 2019)
  - Total: 60,500
  - Density: 1,390/km^{2} (3,610/sq mi)
- Demonyms: Anziati, Portodanzesi
- Time zone: UTC+1 (CET)
  - Summer (DST): UTC+2 (CEST)
- Postal code: 00042
- Dialing code: 06
- Patron saint: St. Anthony
- Website: Official website

Anzio (/ˈænzioʊ/, also US: /ˈɑːntsioʊ/; Italian: [ˈantsjo]) is a resort town and comune in the Lazio region of Italy, about 51 kilometres (32 mi) south of Rome.

Well known for its seaside resorts, it is a fishing port and a departure point for ferries and hydroplanes to the Pontine Islands of Ponza, Palmarola, and Ventotene. The town bears great historical significance as the site of Operation Shingle, a crucial landing by the Allies during the Italian Campaign of World War II.

== History ==
=== Legacy of Antium ===
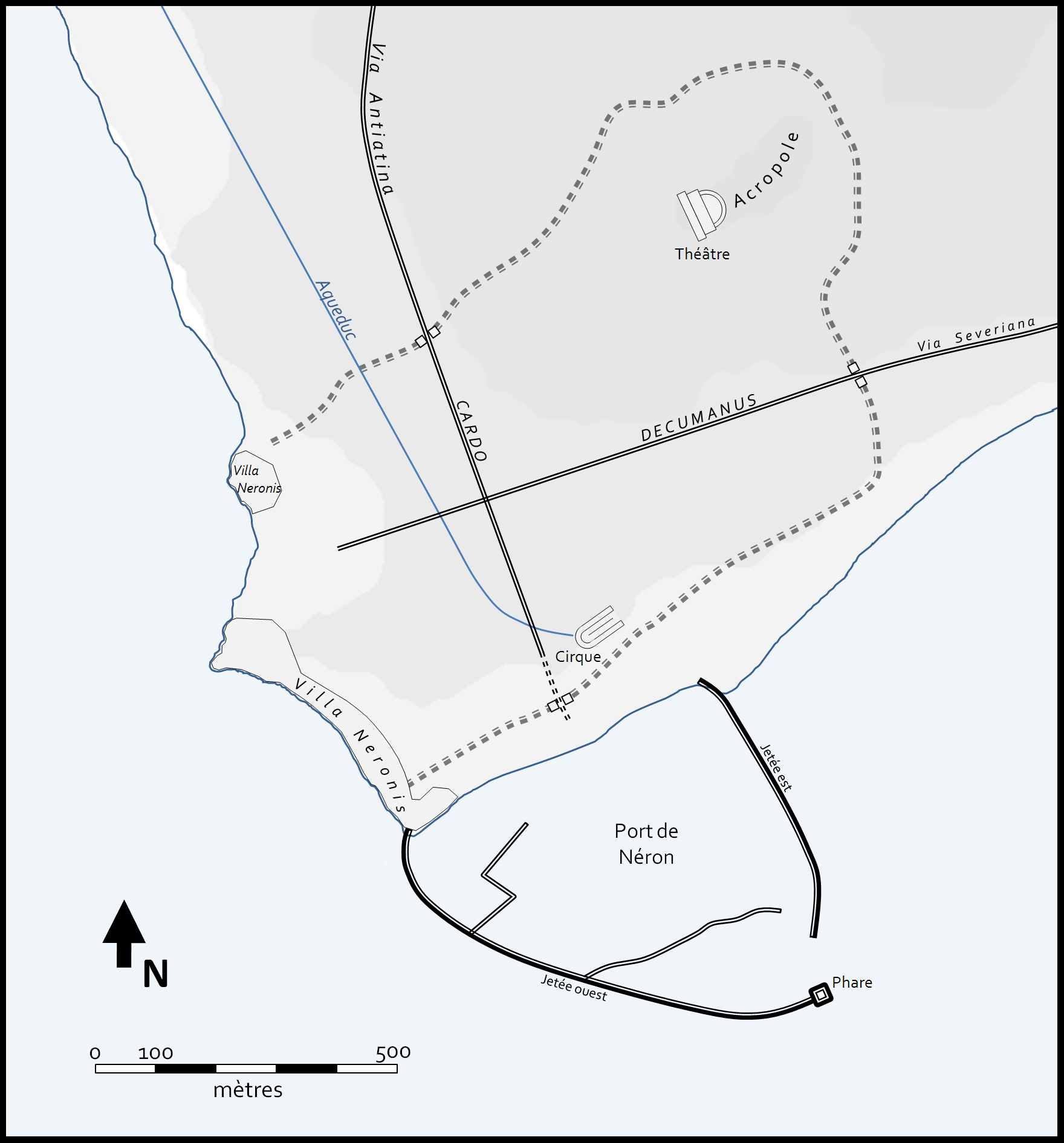
Plan of Antium

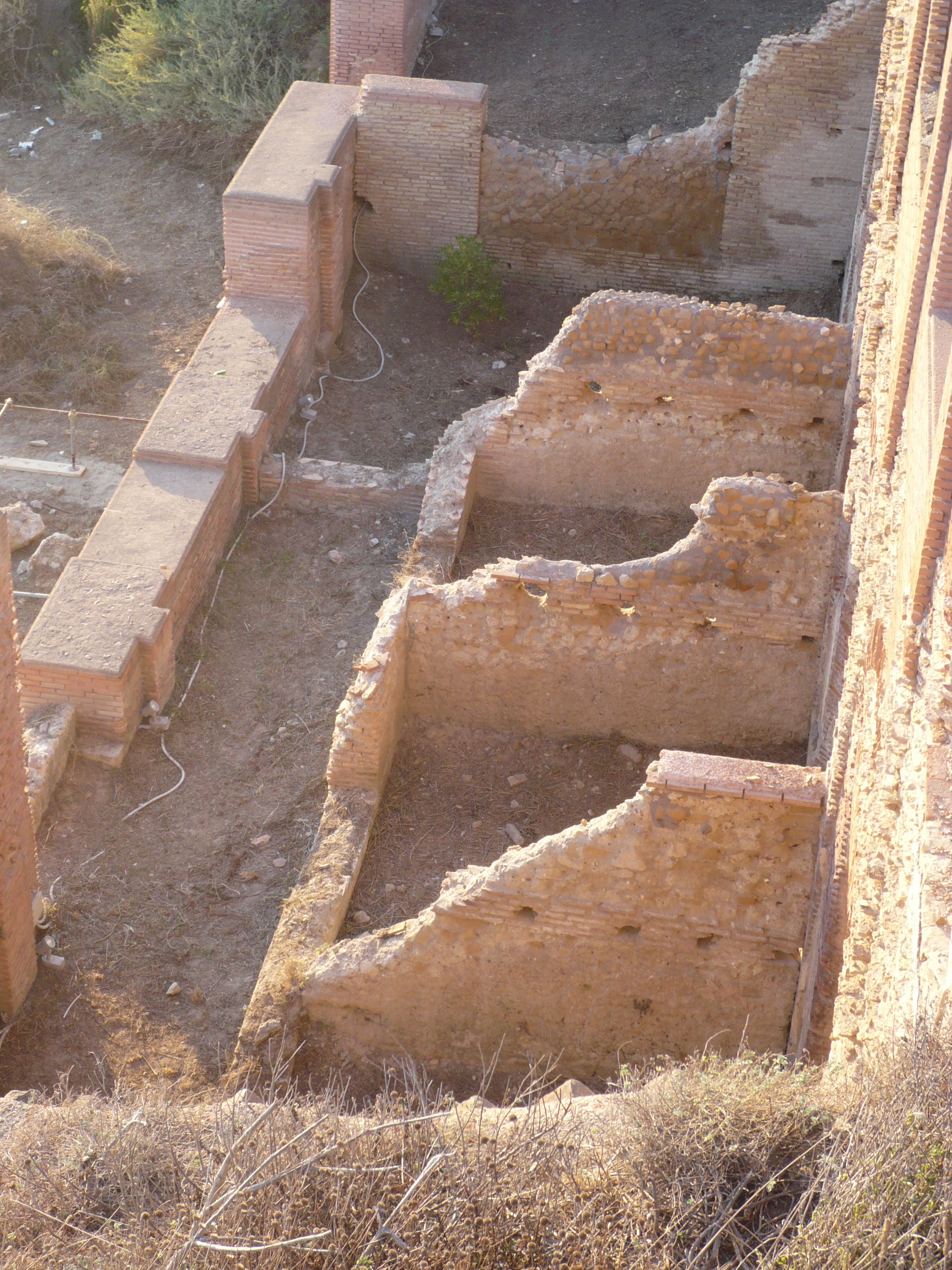
Library of the imperial villa

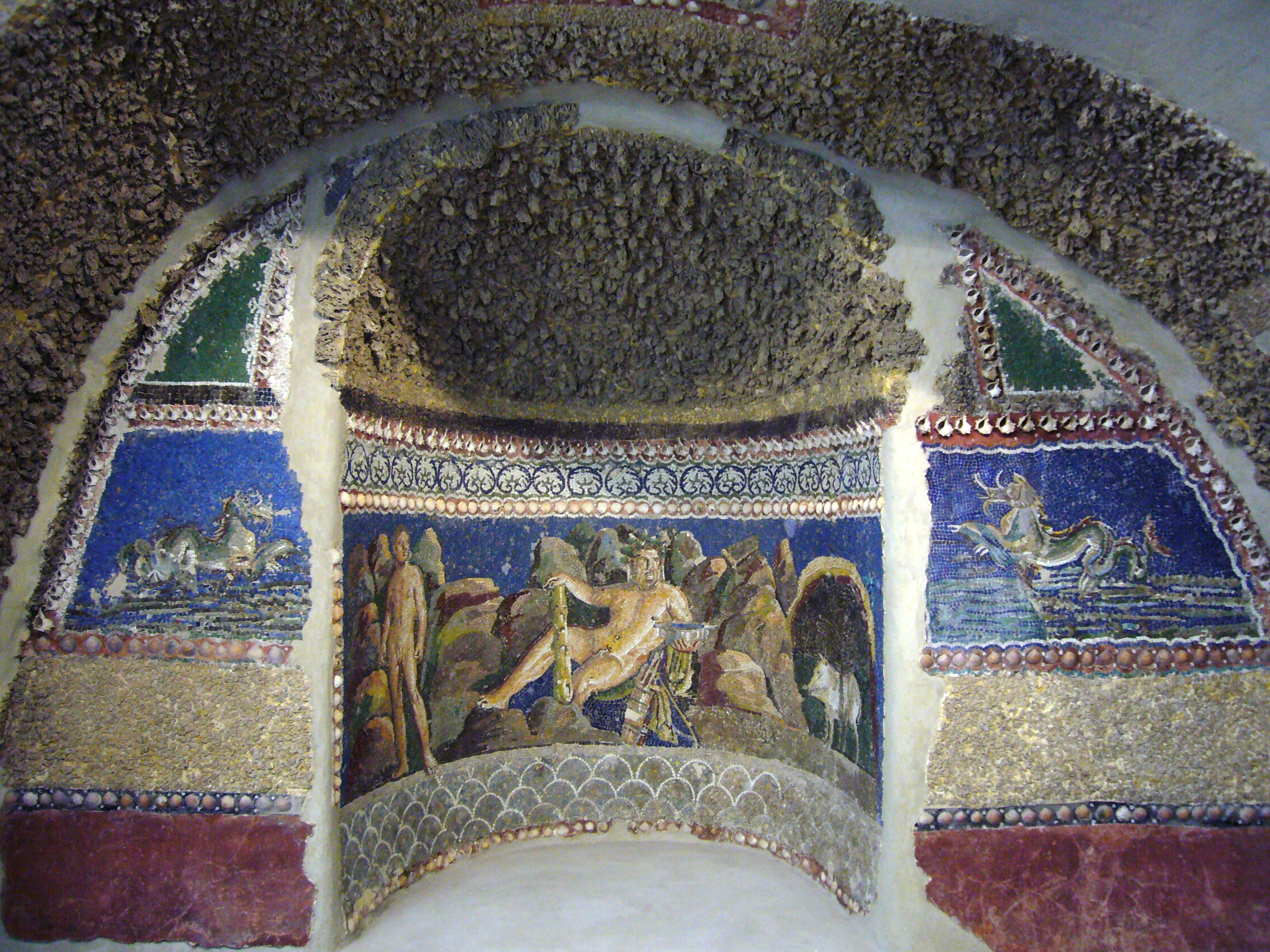
Mosaic from the nymphaeum

The symbol of Anzio is the goddess Fortuna, in reference to her veneration in the ancient Antium, whose territory Anzio occupies a very important part; so that it retains the heritage of the ancient town in archaeological terms: the settlement of Antium, over the centuries, was certainly present in the area of modern Anzio (the Capo d'Anzio).

In the Roman era the territory of Antium almost entirely corresponded to modern Anzio and nearby Nettuno.

In the Middle Ages Antium was deserted in favour of Nettuno, which maintained the legacy of the ancient settlement.

=== Modern Era ===
At the end of the sixteenth century Pope Clement VIII, who had purchased the lordship over Nettuno (the territory of which incorporated Anzio) for the Apostolic Chamber, gave instructions to Monsignor Bartolomeo Cesi to take steps to safeguard the building heritage of Anzio. A century later, in the last decade of the seventeenth century, by the will of Pope Innocent XII the port was rebuilt which gave rise to a notable economic recovery in the area, which continued throughout the eighteenth century. At the end of the 17th century Innocent XII and Clement XI restored the harbour, not on the old site of the Roman one of Nero, but to the east of it, with the opening to the east, a mistake which leads to its being frequently silted up; it has a depth of about 5 metres (16 ft). The sea is encroaching slightly at Anzio, but some kilometres farther north-west the old Roman coast-line now lies slightly inland (see Tiber).

A village arose and developed after the construction of the new harbour - completed in 1700 - with the Roman aristocracy discovering the area.

In 1857 Pope Pius IX founded the modern municipality (comune) of Anzio, with the boundaries of Nettuno being redrawn to accommodate the new town; however, the official name of the new municipality was Porto d'Anzio until 1885.

Anzio knew a remarkable development as a seaside resort at the end of the 19th century.

In 1925, Anzio became one of the central places of the telecommunication revolution. On 16 March 1925, the "Station" of the submarine telegraph cable was inaugurated in Anzio, the first telecommunication cable connected directly from Anzio to New York. The following submarine telegraph cable united Italy with Argentina, Brazil, and Uruguay through this "Station" in Anzio.

==== World War II ====
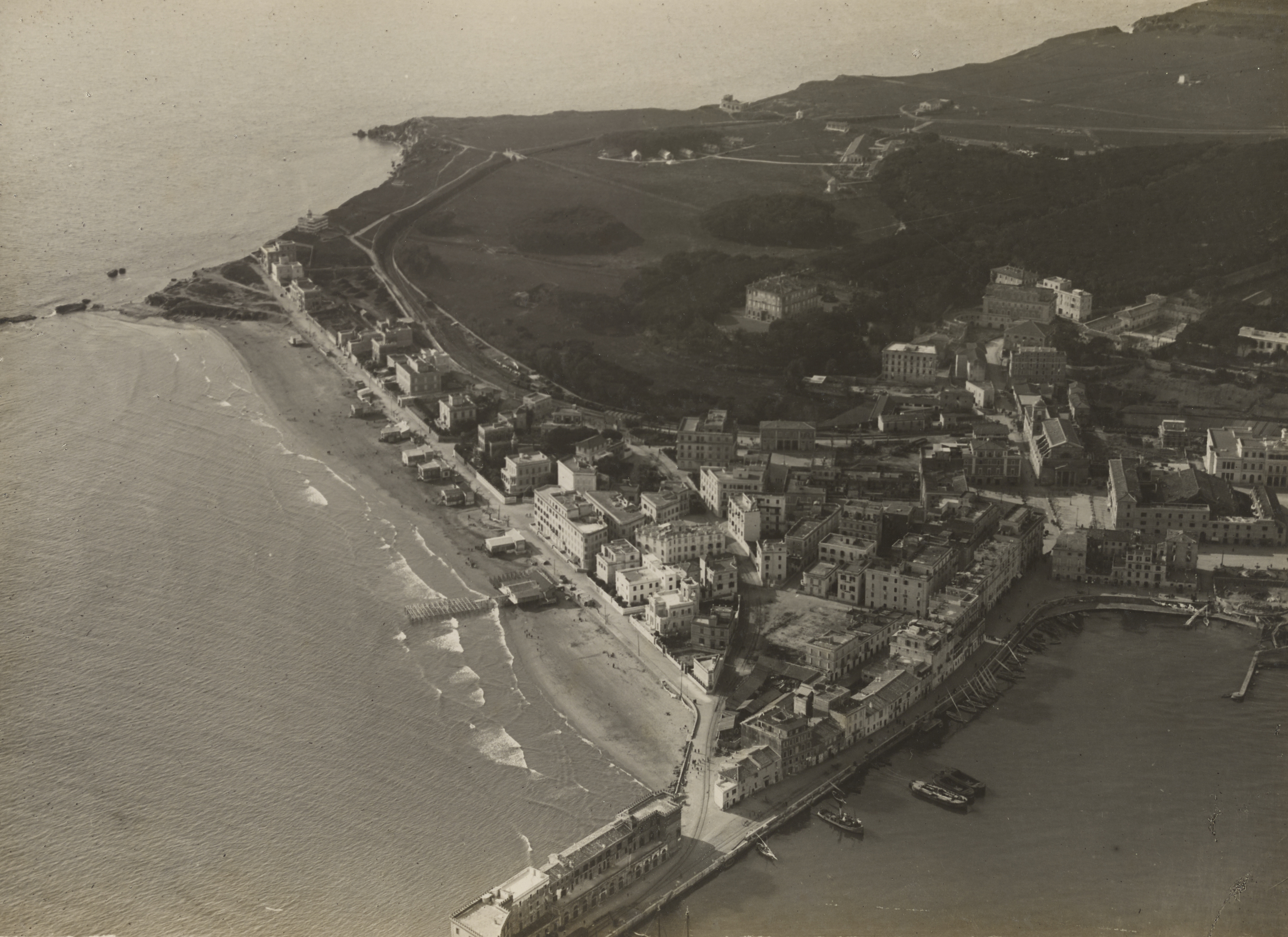
Anzio in the 1940s

From 1940 to 1945 Anzio was united with Nettuno in a single municipality (comune): Nettunia.

Anzio and Nettuno are also notable as sites of an Allied forces landing and the ensuing Battle of Anzio during World War II. The Commonwealth Anzio War Cemetery and Beach Head War Cemetery are located here.

In February 1944 American soldiers (the U.S. Fifth Army) were surrounded by Germans in the caves of Pozzoli for a week, suffering heavy casualties. A film based on the events called Anzio (1968, directed by Edward Dmytryk) was made, starring Robert Mitchum and based on a book by Wynford Vaughan-Thomas.

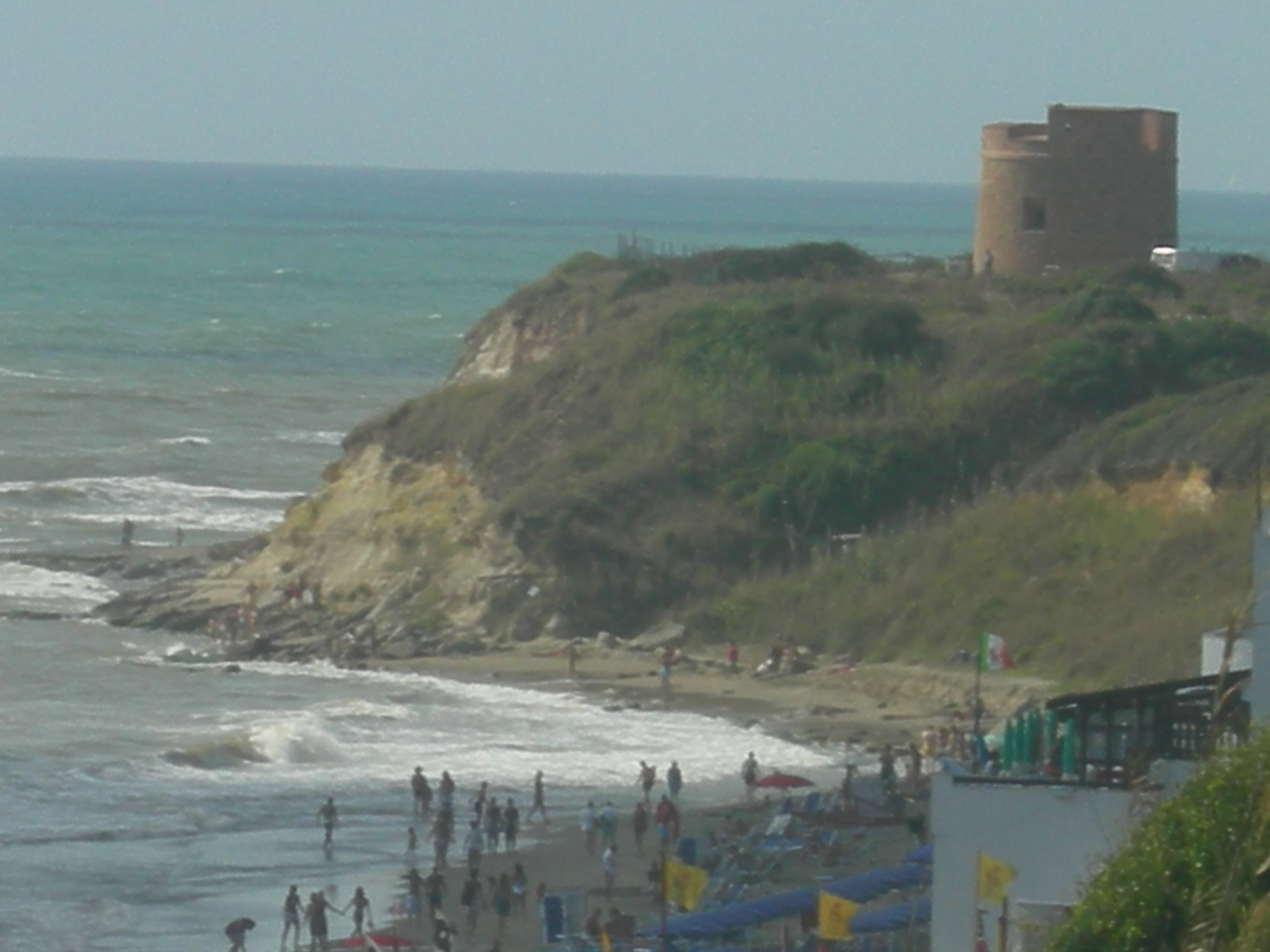
Tor Caldara Tower and the Anzio beach.

On 18 February 1944, the British light cruiser Penelope was struck by two torpedoes off the coast of Anzio and sunk with a loss of 417 crew.

In the same region Lieutenant Eric Fletcher Waters of the British Army lost his life in battle while serving as a member of the 8th Battalion, Royal Fusiliers (City of London Regiment), part of the 167th (London) Infantry Brigade of the 56th (London) Infantry Division which fought at Anzio for nearly six weeks. His son, Roger Waters, became the bassist and main lyricist of progressive rock band, Pink Floyd. In his honour and remembrance Roger Waters recorded the song "The Fletcher Memorial Home", which is the maiden name of Eric Waters' mother. (Also see "When the Tigers Broke Free".)

==== Post-war ====
On September 14, 1948, a waterspout came ashore in the town, which threw a mobile home 40 metres (44 yd) and threw a car "violently" into a tree. This tornado never received an official rating from the European Severe Storms Laboratory, however, the La Stampa newspaper wrote an article how it was "exceptionally violent". According to La Stampa, a wooden and brick home was completely destroyed, ten homes had their roofs completely torn off, and about 50 large pine trees were completely uprooted. The tornado caused several million lire in damage.

== Main sights ==
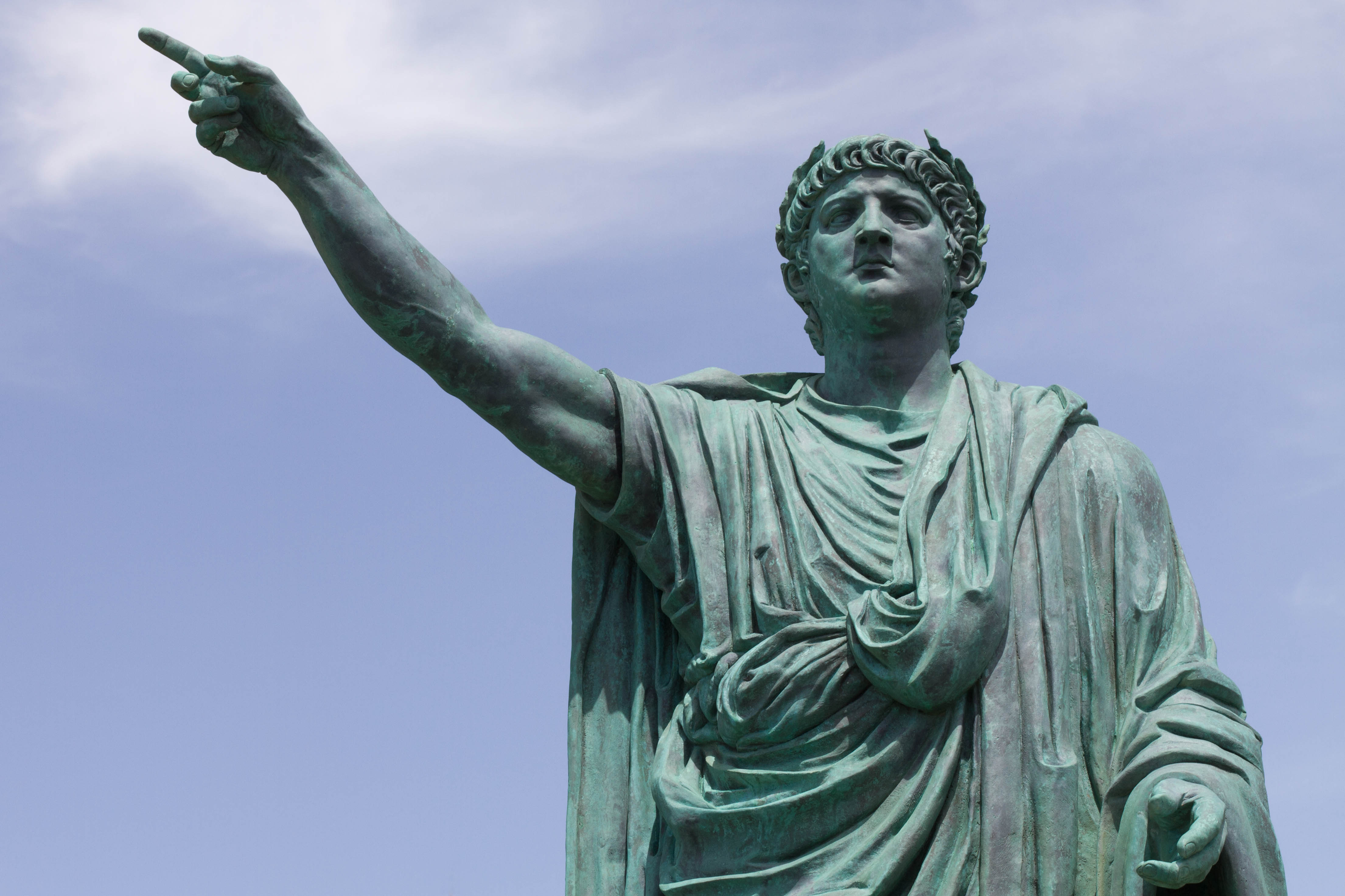
Statue of Nero in Anzio by Claudio Valenti (2010).

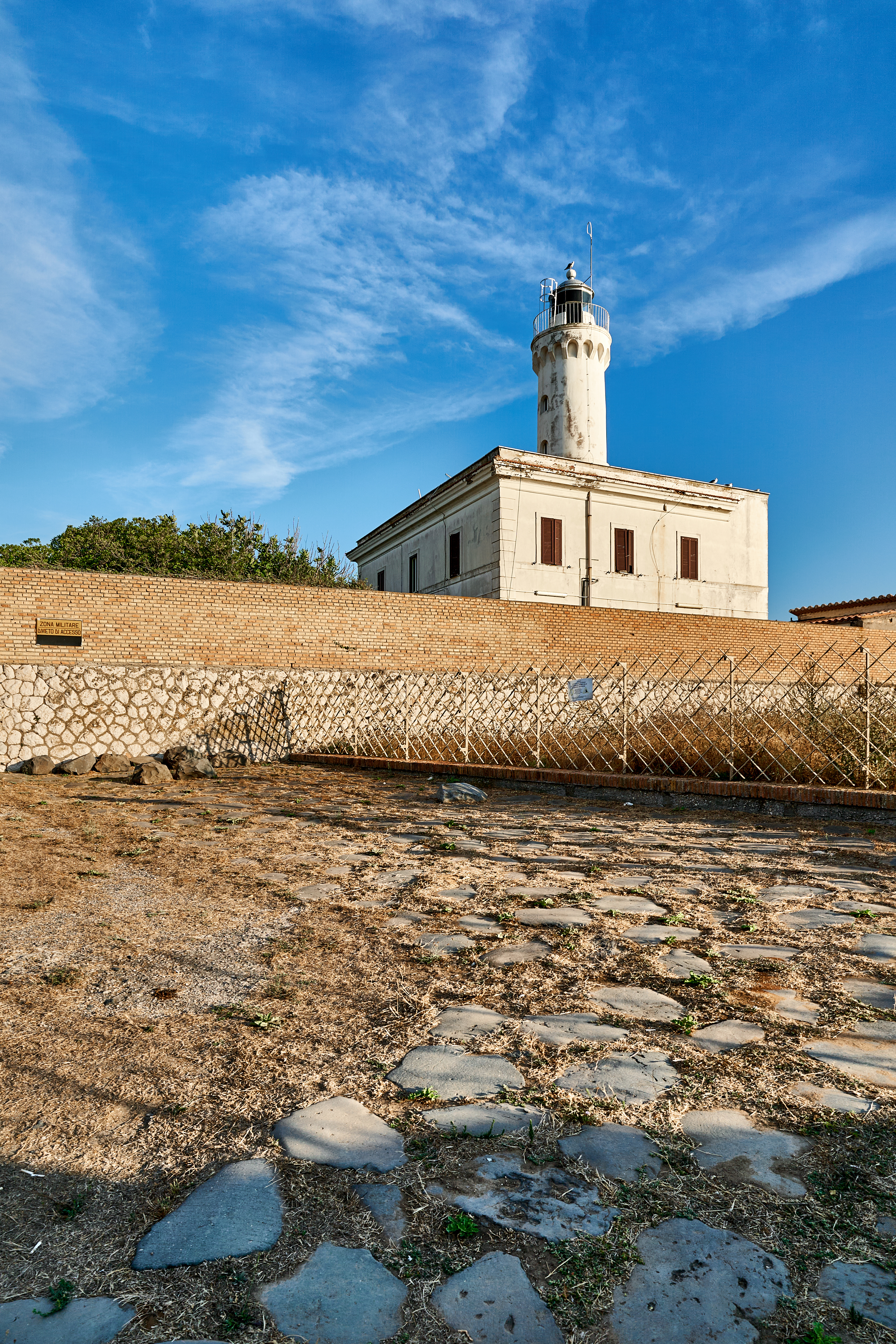
Anzio lighthouse

Along the coast are numerous remains of Roman villas. One, the Domus Neroniana, has been identified as a residence of Nero (the villa was subsequently enlarged by Domitian, Hadrian and Septimius Severus); he and Caligula were born in Antium and, according to Giuseppe Lugli, right there ("one or more villas of the Julia gens"). There are also the ruins of the villa of Cicero.

In Anzio can be found the Anzio War Cemetery, located close to the Communal Cemetery and Beachhead Museum. The Beach Head War Cemetery is located 5-kilometre north on No207 Road. The Sicily-Rome American Cemetery and Memorial is in nearby Nettuno.

About 8 kilometres (5 miles) north of the town there is a WWF park with sulphur springs and a medieval tower, Tor Caldara.

Near the ruins of the Villa of Nero, in scenic position near the beach, lies the military sanatorium of the Italian Army, one of the most important works of Florestano Di Fausto, built-in 1930–1933.

All along the coast a large number of beaches and sea resorts can be found, including hotels and the famous fish restaurants of the port of Anzio. The town once hosted a Casino called Paradiso sul mare, that is no longer active and now hosts cultural events. In the southern part of Anzio, close to the border with Nettuno, are many Italian Art Nouveau style houses.

== Transportation ==
The town is connected to Rome by the Via Nettunense (SS207), the Via Ardeatina (SS601) and by the Roma-Nettuno railway that connects Anzio with Roma Termini in around 1 hour. The railway line also stops in the stations of Padiglione, Lido di Lavinio, Villa Claudia, Marechiaro, Anzio Colonia to the north of Anzio.

Ferries and hydrofoils connect Anzio to Ponza.

== Notable people ==
These are some notable Anzio residents.

- Roberta Mancino, skydiver
- Alessio Romagnoli, professional footballer
- Caligula, the Roman emperor, born in Antium
- Nero, the Roman emperor, born in Antium

== Twin towns – sister cities ==
Anzio is twinned with:

- Bad Pyrmont, Germany
- Paphos, Cyprus
- Caen, France
