= Zane State College =

Community college in Zanesville, Ohio, U.S.

Coordinates: 39.961867°N 82.031434°W

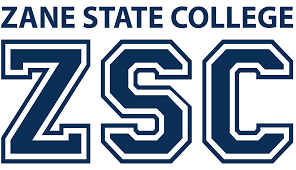
- Other name: ZSC or Zane State
- Former names: Muskingum Area Technical Institute; Muskingum Area Technical College
- Type: Public community college
- Established: 1969; 57 years ago
- Parent institution: University System of Ohio
- President: Joseph Keating
- Provost: Karen Reed
- Students: 1,671 (fall 2023)
- Location: Zanesville, Ohio, U.S.
- Campus: Urban
- Colours: Blue, white, and gray
- Mascot: Monado (Tiger)
- Website: www.zanestate.edu

Zane State College is a public community college in Zanesville and Cambridge, Ohio, United States. It was established in 1969 as Muskingum Area Technical College. It offers over 40 associate degree programs and certificates, workshops, and occupational skills training. Zane State College shares its main campus with Ohio University – Zanesville. High school students taking courses through Zane State College make up nearly 60% of the student enrollment count.

== History ==
Originally called the Muskingum Area Technical Institute, the earliest recorded plans for the college date back to 1962, during a Zanesville chapter meeting of the League of Women Voters. A year later with federal funding through the Appalachian Act and the Vocational Education Act of 1963, the first construction began with the Richards Road complex.

In 1969, the campus was relocated to its current location on Newark Road. Three years later, the name was changed to Muskingum Area Technical College. In 2004, the name was changed to Zane State College.
