= List of cemeteries in Italy =

This is a list of cemeteries in Italy still in existence. Only notable cemeteries are included, and churchyards are excluded.

== List of modern cemeteries ==
Name	Type or religious affiliation	Established	Location	Region	References
Old English Cemetery, Livorno	Evangelical	1645	Livorno	Tuscany	
Protestant Cemetery, Rome	Protestant	1716	Rome	Lazio	
Cemetery of the 366 Fossae, Naples		1762	Naples	Campania	
San Michele Cemetery, Venice	Monumental	1807	Venice	Veneto	
Monumental Cemetery of Brescia	Monumental	1810	Brescia	Lombardy	
Cemetery of Poggioreale	Monumental		Naples	Campania	
Monumental Cemetery of Rimini	Monumental	1813	Rimini	Emilia-Romagna	
English Cemetery, Naples	Protestant	1826	Naples	Campania	
English Cemetery, Florence	Evangelical	1827	Florence	Tuscany	
Campo Verano	Monumental	1835	Rome	Lazio	
Monumental Cemetery of Staglieno	Monumental	1851	Genoa	Liguria	
Coriano Ridge War Cemetery	Military	1945	Coriano	Emilia-Romagna	

== List of ancient and early modern burial sites ==
Name	Type	In use	Location	Region	References
Catacombe dei Cappuccini	Catacombs		Palermo	Sicily	
Fontanelle Cemetery	Charnel house		Naples	Campania	
