= OHSAA East/Southeast Regions athletic conferences =

Athletic conferences in Ohio

This is a list of high school athletic conferences in the East and Southeast Regions of Ohio, as defined by the OHSAA. Because the names of localities and their corresponding high schools do not always match and because there is often a possibility of ambiguity with respect to either the name of a locality or the name of a high school, the following table gives both in every case, with the locality name first, in plain type, and the high school name second in boldface type. The school's team nickname is given last.

== Buckeye 8 Athletic League ==
All schools are also affiliated with the Ohio Valley Athletic Conference.

Big School Division

- East Liverpool **Beaver Local** Beavers (2013–)
- Wellsburg (WV) **Brooke** Bruins (2025–)
- **Cambridge** Bobcats (2021–)
- **East Liverpool** Potters (2013–)
- Wintersville **Indian Creek** Redskins (2005–)
- **St. Clairsville** Red Devils (2005–)

Small School Division

- **Barnesville** Shamrocks (2025–)
- **Bellaire** Big Reds (2005–)
- Rayland **Buckeye Local** Panthers (2005–2020, 2025–)
- Cadiz **Harrison Central** Huskies (2005–)
- **Martins Ferry** Purple Riders (2005–)
- Belmont **Union Local** Jets (2005–)

Former Members

- Richmond **Edison** Wildcats (2005–2023)

== Frontier Athletic Conference ==
This league formed in October 2016 in preparation for August 2017 from the remnants of the South Central Ohio League.

- **Chillicothe** Cavaliers (2017–)
- **Hillsboro** Indians (2017–)
- **Jackson** Ironmen (2017–)
- Greenfield **McClain** Tigers (2017–)
- Washington Court House **Miami Trace** Panthers (2017–)
- **Washington Court House** Blue Lions (2017–)

== Independents ==
- **Manchester** Greyhounds (football only, Southern Hills member in other sports)
- Seaman **North Adams** Green Devils (football only, Southern Hills member in other sports)
- **Peebles** Indians (football only, Southern Hills member in other sports)
- **West Union** Dragons (football only, Southern Hills member in other sports)

== Inter-Valley Conference ==
Large school division

- Uhrichsville **Claymont** Mustangs (2017-)
- Sugarcreek **Garaway** Pirates (1968–)
- Berlin **Hiland** Hawks (No football) (1968–)
- Gnadenhutten **Indian Valley** Braves (2017–)
- **Newcomerstown** Trojans (1968–)
- West Lafayette **Ridgewood** Generals (1968–)
- Zoarville **Tuscarawas Valley** Trojans (1974–77, 2017–)

Small school division

- Lore City **Buckeye Trail** Warriors (2017-)
- Bowerstown **Conotton Valley** Rockets (2001–11, 2017–) (All sports except football)
- **East Canton** Hornets (2013-)
- **Malvern** Hornets (1968–)
- Magnolia **Sandy Valley** Cardinals (2001–)
- Strasburg **Strasburg-Franklin** Tigers (1971–)
- New Philadelphia **Tuscarawas Central Catholic** Saints (1970–)

Former members

- Midvale **Indian Valley North** Big Blue (1968–88, consolidated into Indian Valley)
- Gnadenhutten **Indian Valley South** Rebels (1968–88, consolidated into Indian Valley)
- Dover **St. Joseph** Ramblers (1968–70, consolidated into Tuscarawas Central Catholic)
- Dennison **St. Mary's** Blue Wave (1968–70, consolidated into Tuscarawas Central Catholic)
- Freeport **Lakeland** Raiders (1974–99, consolidated into Harrison Central)
- **Jewett-Scio** Vikings (1974–99, consolidated into Harrison Central)

== Mid-Ohio Valley League ==
- **Bridgeport** Bulldogs (2019–)
- **Caldwell** Redskins (2023–)
- New Matamoras **Frontier** Cougars (2019–)
- Woodsfield **Monroe Central** Seminoles (2019–)
- Hannibal **River** Pilots (2019–)
- **Shadyside** Tigers (2019–)
- Sarahsville **Shenandoah** Zeppelins (2021–)

Former members

- **Barnesville** Shamrocks (2021–2024)
- **Beallsville** Blue Devils (2021–2025, school closed)
- Rayland **Buckeye Local** Panthers (2021–2024)
- New Martinsville (WV) **Magnolia** Blue Eagles (2019–2021)
- **Paden City** (WV) Wildcats (2021–2025, school closed)

== Muskingum Valley League ==
Big school Division

- New Concord **John Glenn** Muskies (1962–)
- Zanesville **Maysville** Panthers (1963–)
- Duncan Falls **Philo** Electrics (1938–)
- Warsaw **River View** Black Bears (1973–2003, 2020–)
- Thornville **Sheridan** Generals (1966–)
- Dresden **Tri-Valley** Scotties (1966–)

Small school Division

- **Coshocton** Redskins (2020–)
- **Crooksville** Ceramics (1930–, known as Big Red until 1935)
- Byesville **Meadowbrook** Colts (2020–)
- McConnelsville **Morgan** Raiders (1966–)
- **New Lexington** Panthers (1930–)
- Zanesville **West Muskingum** Tornadoes (1966–)

Former Member

- **Glouster Trimble** Tomcats (1930–65)
- McConnelsville **Malta-McConnelsville** Big Reds (1930–66, consolidated into Morgan)
- **New Concord** Little Muskies (1930–62, consolidated into John Glenn)
- **Caldwell** Redskins (1933–64)
- **Roseville** Ramblers (1944–70, consolidated into Philo)
- Zanesville **St. Thomas** Irish (1944–46)
- Dresden **Jefferson** J-Hawks (1950–66, consolidated into Tri-Valley)

== Ohio Valley Athletic Conference ==
Division A

- Bowerston **Conotton Valley** Rockets
- **Cameron** (WV) Dragons
- New Matamoras **Frontier** Cougars
- Columbiana **Heartland Christian** Lions
- Leetonia **Leetonia** Bears
- Weirton (WV) **Madonna** Blue Dons
- Morgantown (WV) **Trinity Christian** Warriors
- Pine Grove (WV) **Valley** Lumberjacks
- **Wellsville** Tigers
- Parkersburg (WV) **Parkersburg Catholic** Crusaders
- Williamstown (WV) **Wood County** Wildcats

Division AA

- **Bridgeport** Bulldogs
- **Caldwell** Redskins
- Blacksville (WV) **Clay-Battelle** Cee-Bees
- **Lisbon** Blue Devils
- New Martinsville (WV) **Magnolia** Blue Eagles
- Hannibal **River** Pilots
- **Shadyside** Tigers
- Salineville **Southern Local** Indians
- **Steubenville Catholic Central** Crusaders
- **Toronto** Red Knights
- Youngstown **Valley Christian** Eagles

Division AAA

- **Barnesville** Shamrocks
- **Bellaire** Big Reds
- Lore City **Buckeye Trail** Warriors
- Columbiana **Columbiana** Clippers
- East Palestine **East Palestine** Bulldogs
- Beverly **Fort Frye** Cadets
- **Martins Ferry** Purple Riders
- Woodsfield **Monroe Central** Seminoles
- Sarahsville **Shenandoah** Zeps
- Hanoverton **United Local** Golden Eagles
- **Wheeling Central Catholic** (WV) Maroon Knights

Division AAAA

- East Liverpool **Beaver Local** Beavers
- Rayland **Buckeye Local** Panthers
- **Cambridge** Bobcats
- **East Liverpool** Potters
- Richmond **Edison** Wildcats
- Wheeling (WV) **Linsly** Cadets
- Cadiz **Harrison Central** Huskies
- Wintersville **Indian Creek** Redskins
- New Cumberland (WV) **Oak Glen** Golden Bears
- **St. Clairsville** Red Devils
- Belmont **Union Local** Jets
- Weirton (WV) **Weir** Red Raiders

Division AAAAA

- Wellsburg (WV) **Brooke** Bruins
- Glen Dale (WV) **John Marshall** Monarchs
- **Marietta** Tigers
- **Morgantown** (WV) Mohigans
- **Steubenville** Big Red
- Morgantown (WV) **University** Hawks
- Vincent **Warren** Warriors
- Wheeling (WV) **Wheeling Park** Patriots

=== Conference affiliations ===
- **Buckeye 8 Conference** - Beaver Local, Bellaire, Cambridge, East Liverpool, Edison, Harrison Central, Indian Creek, Martins Ferry, St. Clairsville, Union Local
- **Eastern Ohio Athletic Conference** - Columbiana, East Palestine, Southern, Leetonia, Lisbon David Anderson, United, Valley Christian, Wellsville
- **Inter-Valley Conference** - Buckeye Trail, Conotton Valley
- **Mason Dixon Conference** - Cameron, Clay-Battelle, Madonna, Valley
- **Mid-Ohio Valley League** - Barnesville, Bridgeport, Buckeye Local, Frontier, Monroe Central, River, Shadyside, Shenandoah
- **North Central Athletic Conference** - Morgantown, University
- **Two Rivers Athletic Conference** - Brooke, John Marshall, Morgantown, University, Wheeling Park

== Ohio Valley Conference ==
- **Chesapeake** Panthers (1954–)
- Coal Grove **Dawson-Bryant** Hornets (1954–)
- Proctorville **Fairland** Dragons (1957–)
- Gallipolis **Gallia Academy** Blue Devils (2015–)
- **Ironton** Fighting Tigers (2014–) (all sports except football)
- **Portsmouth** Trojans (2014–)
- Ironton **Rock Hill** Redmen (1954–)
- **South Point** Pointers (1954–)

Former members:

- **Oak Hill** Oaks (1954–84)
- Ironton **St. Joseph Central** Flyers (1962–79)
- Willow Wood **Symmes Valley** Vikings (1962–71, 1977–84)
- **Ceredo-Kenova** (WV) Wonders (1986–91; consolidated into Spring Valley HS in 1998)
- **Buffalo (Wayne)** (WV) Bison (1987–92; consolidated into Spring Valley HS in 1998)
- **Wayne** (WV) Pioneers (1987–88)
- Bidwell **River Valley** Raiders (2002–14)

== Scioto Valley Conference ==
- Frankfort **Adena** Warriors^{1} (1968–)
- Chillicothe **Huntington** Huntsmen^{1} (1972–)
- Bainbridge **Paint Valley** Bearcats^{1} (1962–)
- **Piketon** Redstreaks (1962–)
- Chillicothe **Southeastern** Panthers (1975–)
- Chillicothe **Unioto** Shermans^{1} (1962–74, 1975–)
- Williamsport **Westfall** Mustangs (1964–)
- Chillicothe **Zane Trace** Pioneers^{1} (1971–)

Former members:

- **Laurelville** Wildcats (1962–72, consolidated into Logan Elm)
- Circleville **Logan Elm** Braves (1962–73, to Mid-State League)
- Lees Creek **East Clinton** Astros (1972–74)
- Chillicothe **Bishop Flaget (Catholic)** Panthers (1975–86, school closed)
1. Ross County schools that were concurrent in SVC and Ross County League from date of SVC entrance until 1975.

== Southern Hills Athletic Conference ==
Formed in 1970 as the Adams County League, Brown County League, and Highland County League merged to provide a stable schedule after consolidation decimated all three. The league has an odd distinction in that all of its current members were league members by its second year, giving the SHAC a level of continuity that most rural-based leagues do not have.

Division I

- Winchester **Eastern** Warriors (1970–)
- **Lynchburg-Clay** Mustangs (no football, 1970–)
- Seaman **North Adams** Green Devils (1970–)
- **Ripley-Union-Lewis-Huntington** Blue Jays (no football, 1970–)
- **West Union** Dragons (1970–)

Division II

- Leesburg **Fairfield** Lions (no football, 1970–)
- **Fayetteville-Perry** Rockets (1970–, Independent in football 2025–)
- **Manchester** Greyhounds (1971–)
- **Peebles** Indians (1971–)
- Mowrystown **Whiteoak** Wildcats (no football, 1970–)

Former schools

- **Georgetown** G-Men/Lady G-men (no football, 1970–97, to Southern Buckeye Athletic/Academic Conference)
- **Jefferson** Eagles (1970–71, consolidated into West Union)
- Mount Orab **Western Brown** Broncos (1970–72, to Clermont County League)
- St. Martin **School of Brown County Ursulines** Brown Bears (all girls, 1972–81, school closed)
- Latham **Western** Indians (1985–2002, to Southern Ohio Conference)

== Southern Ohio Conference ==
Division I (Smaller schools)

- Portsmouth **Clay** Panthers (1979–) (no football)
- New Boston **Glenwood** Tigers (1946–) (no football)
- Franklin Furnace **Green** Bobcats (1979–)
- Portsmouth **Notre Dame** Titans (Portsmouth Central Catholic until 1984, 1954–)
- Ironton **St. Joseph Central** Flyers (1982–89, 2019–) (no football)
- Portsmouth **Sciotoville Community** Tartans (Portsmouth East until 2001, 1946–)
- Crown City **South Gallia** Rebels (2023–)
- Willow Wood **Symmes Valley** Vikings (1991–)
- Latham **Western** Indians (2002–) (no football)

Division II (Larger schools)

- Beaver **Eastern** Eagles (1981–) *plays in Div. I for football
- **Minford** Falcons (1947–58, 1959–)
- McDermott **Northwest** Mohawks (1960–) *plays in Div. I for football
- **Oak Hill** Oaks (1991–)
- West Portsmouth **Portsmouth West** Senators (Washington Twp. until 1950, 1946–)
- **South Webster** Jeeps (1979–) *plays in Div. I for golf and boys soccer (no football)
- Lucasville **Valley** Indians (1958–) *plays in Div. I for boys soccer
- **Waverly** Tigers (1946–70, 1983–)
- **Wheelersburg** Pirates (1950–)

Former members

- Portsmouth **Holy Redeemer** Wildcats (1946–54, consolidated into Central Catholic)
- Portsmouth **St. Mary's** Titans (1946–54, consolidated into Central Catholic)
- **Chesapeake** Panthers (1948–54, to Ohio Valley Conference)
- **South Point** Pointers (1948–51, to Lawrence County League)
- Coal Grove **Dawson-Bryant** Hornets (1950–52, to Lawrence County League)
- **Piketon** Redstreaks (1958–62, to Scioto Valley League)

== Tri-Valley Conference ==
Ohio Division

- Albany **Alexander** Spartans (1974–)
- The Plains **Athens** Bulldogs (2008–)
- Pomeroy **Meigs** Marauders (1983–)
- **Nelsonville-York** Buckeyes (1970–)
- Bidwell **River Valley** Raiders (2014–)
- McArthur **Vinton County** Vikings (1969–)
- **Wellston** Golden Rockets (1982–)

Hocking Division

- **Belpre** Golden Eagles (1969–)
- Reedsville **Eastern** Eagles (1993–)
- Stewart **Federal Hocking** Lancers (1969–)
- Racine **Southern** Tornadoes (1993–)
- Glouster **Trimble** Tomcats (1978–)
- **Waterford** Wildcats (1997–)

Future Members - Muskingum Division:

- Beverly Fort Frye Cadets (Joins 2027)
- Marietta Tigers (Joins 2027)
- Vincent **Warren** Warriors (1969–1986), (Rejoins 2027)

Former Members:

- Corning **Miller** Falcons (1983–2020)
- Crown City **South Gallia** Rebels (2010–2023)
- Mason (WV) **Wahama** White Falcons (2010–2020)
- Vincent **Warren** Warriors (1969–1986)

== See also ==
- Ohio High School Athletic Association
