= Ohio Valley Athletic Conference =

High school sports league in Ohio and West Virginia

- Classification: OHSAA Divisions I-VII; WVSSAC Divisions A-AAA
- Founded: 1943
- Sports fielded: Football, Cross Country, Golf, Soccer, Tennis, Basketball, Swimming, Wrestling, Baseball, Softball, Bowling, Cheer, Track and Field, Volleyball,
- No. of teams: 54
- Region: Ohio; West Virginia
- Website: http://www.ovac.org

The Ohio Valley Athletic Conference is a high school sports league in parts of southeastern Ohio and northern West Virginia. The OVAC is the largest conference of its kind in the United States. Schools in the upper Ohio Valley supply over 18,000 athletes in various competitive athletic areas. The conference was organized in 1943.

== Classification ==
Schools are categorized by enrollment of eligible athletes, where Class A is the smallest enrollment and Class AAAAA is the largest enrollment. As of the 2025-2026 school year, there are 18,332 eligible athletes in grades 9 through 11.

| Class | Enrollment | Members |
|---|---|---|
| A (1A) | 0-136 | 10 |
| AA (2A) | 137-202 | 11 |
| AAA (3A) | 203-287 | 12 |
| AAAA (4A) | 288-463 | 12 |
| AAAAA (5A) | 464+ | 10 |

== Member schools ==
| School | Nickname | Location | Colors | Joined | Class |
|---|---|---|---|---|---|
| Barnesville | Shamrocks | Barnesville, Ohio | Green, red, white | 1953 | AAA |
| Beaver Local | Beavers | East Liverpool, Ohio | Red, white | 1991 | AAAA |
| Bellaire | Big Reds | Bellaire, Ohio | Red, black | 1943 | AAA |
| Bridgeport | Bulldogs | Bridgeport, Ohio | Columbia blue, white, black | 1946 | AA |
| Brooke | Bruins | Wellsburg, West Virginia | Green, gold | 1969 | AAAAA |
| Buckeye Local | Panthers | Rayland, Ohio | Navy, silver | 1990 | AAA |
| Buckeye Trail | Warriors | Lore City, Ohio | Royal blue, white | 1977 | AAA |
| Caldwell | Redskins | Caldwell, Ohio | Red, white | 1977 | AA |
| Cambridge | Bobcats | Cambridge, Ohio | Royal blue, white | 1974 | AAAA |
| Cameron | Dragons | Cameron, West Virginia | Navy, gold | 1950 | A |
| Clay-Battelle | Cee-Bees | Blacksville, West Virginia | Navy, grey | 2011 | AA |
| Conotton Valley | Rockets | Bowerston, Ohio | Kelly green, white | 1991 | A |
| Crestview | Rebels | Columbiana, Ohio | Yellow, black | 2026 | AAA |
| Dover | Crimson Tornadoes | Dover, Ohio | Crimson, gray | 2019 | AAAAA |
| East Liverpool | Potters | East Liverpool, Ohio | Blue, white | 1973 | AAAA |
| Edison | Wildcats | Richmond, Ohio | Silver, black | 1993 | AAAA |
| Fort Frye | Cadets | Beverly, Ohio | Scarlet red, dover white, royal blue | 1977 | AAA |
| Frontier | Cougars | New Matamoras, Ohio | Columbia blue, vegas gold | 1975 | AA |
| Harrison Central | Huskies | Cadiz, Ohio | Black, silver, royal blue | 1999 | AAAA |
| Indian Creek | Redskins | Wintersville, Ohio | Red, gold | 1993 | AAAA |
| John Marshall | Monarchs | Glen Dale, West Virginia | Vegas gold, brown | 1968 | AAAAA |
| Linsly | Cadets | Wheeling, West Virginia | Orange, black | 1943 | AAA |
| Madonna | Blue Dons | Weirton, West Virginia | Navy, silver, white | 1958 | A |
| Magnolia | Blue Eagles | New Martinsville, West Virginia | Blue, gold | 1949 | AAA |
| Martins Ferry | Purple Riders | Martins Ferry, Ohio | Purple, white | 1943 | AAA |
| Monroe Central | Seminoles | Woodsfield, Ohio | Red, vegas gold, black, white | 1994 | AAA |
| Morgantown | Mohigans | Morgantown, West Virginia | Red, royal blue | 2010 | AAAAA |
| New Philadelphia | Quakers | New Philadelphia, Ohio | Red, black | 2019 | AAAAA |
| Oak Glen | Golden Bears | New Cumberland, West Virginia | Columbia blue, gold, white | 1964 | AAAA |
| Parkersburg South | Patriots | Parkersburg, West Virginia | Blue, scarlet, white | 1975 | AAAAA |
| River | Pilots | Hannibal, Ohio | Scarlet, gray | 1958 | AA |
| Shadyside | Tigers | Shadyside, Ohio | Orange, black | 1943 | AA |
| Shenandoah | Zeps | Sarahsville, Ohio | Forest green, white | 1973 | AA |
| Southern Local | Indians | Salineville, Ohio | Royal blue, athletic gold | 2015 | AA |
| St. Clairsville | Red Devils | St. Clairsville, Ohio | Scarlet, gray | 1947 | AAAA |
| Steubenville | Big Red | Steubenville, Ohio | Crimson red, black | 1943 | AAAAA |
| Steubenville Catholic | Crusaders | Steubenville, Ohio | Royal blue, gold | 1943 | A |
| Toronto | Red Knights | Toronto, Ohio | Red, white | 1950 | AA |
| Trinity Christian | Warriors | Morgantown, West Virginia | Cardinal red, vegas gold | 2009 | A |
| Union Local | Jets | Belmont, Ohio | Red, white | 1959 | AAAA |
| University | Hawks | Morgantown, West Virginia | Crimson, gold, black | 2010 | AAAAA |
| Valley | Lumberjacks | Pine Grove, West Virginia | Black, gold | 1977 | A |
| Warren | Warriors | Vincent, Ohio | Royal blue, white | 2015 | AAAAA |
| Weir | Red Riders | Weirton, West Virginia | Red, black | 1943 | AAAA |
| Wellsville | Tigers | Wellsville, Ohio | Orange, black | 1954 | AA |
| Wheeling Central | Maroon Knights | Wheeling, West Virginia | Maroon, white | 1943 | AA |
| Wheeling Park | Patriots | Wheeling, West Virginia | Red, white, royal | 1976 | AAAAA |

=== Conference affiliations ===
- Buckeye 8 Athletic League - Beaver Local, Bellaire, Cambridge, East Liverpool, Edison, Harrison Central, Indian Creek, Martins Ferry, St. Clairsville, Union Local
- East Central Ohio League - Dover, New Philadelphia, Warren
- Eastern Ohio Athletic Conference - Southern Local, Wellsville
- Mahoning Valley Athletic Conference - Crestview
- Mason Dixon Conference - Cameron, Clay-Battelle, Weirton Madonna
- Two Rivers Athletic Conference - John Marshall, Morgantown, Parkersburg South, University, Wheeling Park
