= Union Local School District =

School district in Ohio, United States

Address
- 66779 Belmont Morristown Road Belmont, Ohio, 43718; United States
- Coordinates: 40.02°N 80.99°W

District information
- Type: Public
- Grades: PK–12
- Schools: 3
- NCES District ID: 3904601

Students and staff
- Students: 1,248 (2025–2026)
- Teachers: 94.64 (on an FTE basis) (2025–2026)
- Staff: 144.60 (on an FTE basis) (2025–2026)
- Student–teacher ratio: 13.19 (2025–2026)

Other information
- Website: www.ulschools.com

The Union Local School District serves Belmont County, Ohio and other surrounding areas. There are three schools in the district: Union Local Elementary School, Union Local Middle School, and Union Local High School. The schools are located on the same piece of land on Route 149. The schools are approximately 1 mile from Morristown, Ohio. The school is nicknamed the "Jets" and is a member of the Ohio Valley Athletic Conference.

== History ==
Union Local School District formed in 1959 with the combining of Smith Twp., Belmont, Bethesda, and Union Twp. schools. Flushing joined in the late 1960s. Union Local Elementary and Middle schools consolidated in 1998. Centerville (Smith Twp.), Morristown (Union Twp.), Belmont, Bethesda, and Flushing all combined to form the middle and elementary School.

== School administrators ==
- High School : Tom Daley
- Athletic Director: Drew Greenwood
- Elementary School Principal: Pre-K-2 Dana Kendziorski, 3-5 Ron Bober

== See also ==
- East Central Ohio ESC
