= Union Local High School (Belmont, Ohio) =

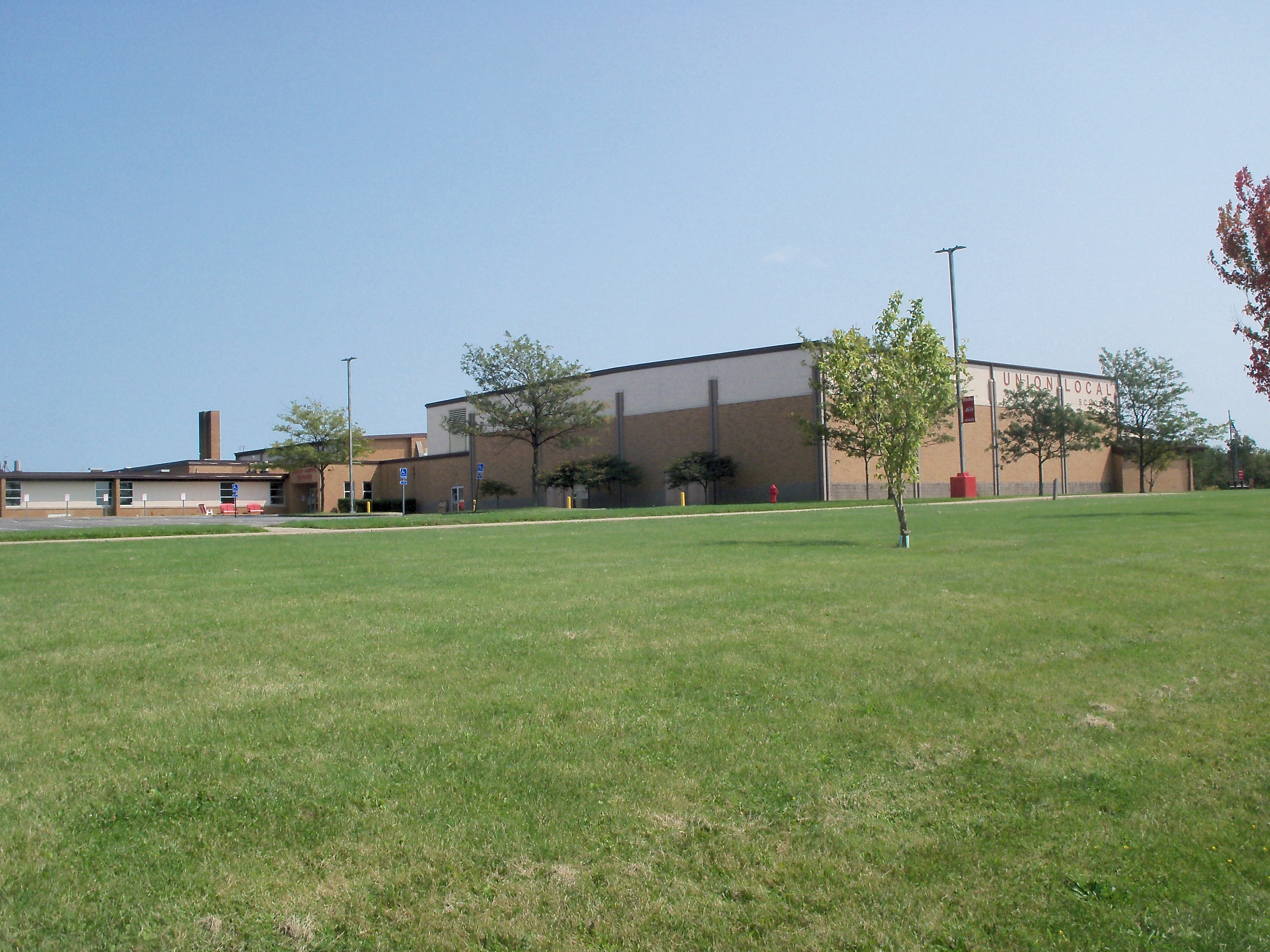

Location
- 66779 Belmont-Morristown Road; Belmont, Ohio 43759; United States
- Coordinates: 40°3′49″N 81°3′12″W

Information
- Type: Public high school
- Established: 1959
- Status: Open
- School district: Union Local School District
- Superintendent: Zac Shutler
- Dean: Mike Menges
- Director: Nick Nardo
- Principal: Thomas Daley
- Teaching staff: 30.64 (FTE)
- Grades: 9th-12th
- Average class size: 24-25 Students
- Student to teacher ratio: 13.22
- Colors: Red and White
- Slogan: Excellence in Education is a LOCAL thing
- Fight song: Wildcat Victory
- Athletics conference: Buckeye 8 Athletic League; Ohio Valley Athletic Conference
- Team name: Jets
- Rivals: St. Clairsville Red Devils; Barnesville Shamrocks
- School fees: $50.00 per 9 weeks
- Website: www.ulschools.com/unionlocalhighschool_home.aspx

Union Local High School is a public high school in Belmont County, Ohio/Morristown, Ohio, United States. It is the only high school in the Union Local School District. Athletic teams compete as the Union Local Jets in the Ohio High School Athletic Association as a member of the Buckeye 8 Athletic League as well as the Ohio Valley Athletic Conference.
