= Indian Creek High School (Wintersville, Ohio) =

Location
- 200 Park Drive; Wintersville, Ohio 43953; United States
- Coordinates: 40°22′36″N 80°42′56″W

Information
- Type: Public high school
- Established: 1902
- School district: Indian Creek Local School District
- Superintendent: T.C. Chappelear
- Principal: Louie Retton
- Teaching staff: 34.22 (FTE)
- Grades: 9-12
- Average class size: 18
- Student to teacher ratio: 16.57
- Campus type: Small Suburb
- Colors: Red and Gold
- Slogan: I Creek
- Athletics conference: Buckeye 8 Athletic League; Ohio Valley Athletic Conference
- Team name: Redskins
- Rival: Richmond Edison Wildcats
- Athletic Director: Joe Dunlevy
- Website: www.iclsd.org

Indian Creek High School is a public high school in Wintersville, Ohio. It is the only secondary school in the Indian Creek Local School District. Athletic teams compete as the Indian Creek Redskins in the Ohio High School Athletic Association as a member of the Buckeye 8 Athletic League as well as the Ohio Valley Athletic Conference.

== History ==
In the late 1960s, the school formerly known as Wintersville High School consolidated with Wayne High School in Bloomingdale, Ohio. The former Wayne Wolves remained but as an elementary school while the high school combined with the Jr. High (Buchanan Braves) and Sr. High school (Wintersville Warriors). In 1993, the Indian Creek Local School District consolidated with Mingo Junction, which resulted in the closing of Mingo Sr. High School. The Mingo students were transferred into Wintersville Sr High School, creating Indian Creek High School. The old Mingo high school was made into Indian Creek Junior High, before moving into the new middle school in January 2013. Mingo's nickname was changed from the Indians, and the combined schools became the Indian Creek Redskins. Although both Wintersville and Mingo's High school voted for the colors to be black and blue, the executive decision was made by the school board to go with Gold and Red against the populus of the two communities. In 2023, a new school building was constructed directly across from the existing one, and the old building was demolished.

== Academics ==
Indian Creek High School employs over 150 teachers, two of which are in the Ohio High School Teacher Hall of Fame.

== Athletics ==
The Indian Creek Redskins compete in the Buckeye 8 of the OHSAA. Indian Creek has many athletics in which students may participate including band, cheerleading, football, soccer, volleyball, cross country, golf, basketball, wrestling, baseball, softball, tennis and track.

== See also ==
- Native American mascot controversy
- Sports teams named Redskins
