= Noble Local School District =

School district in Ohio

Location
- 20977 Zep Road East; Sarahsville, Ohio Appalachian Ohio United States

District information
- Type: Local school district
- Grades: PK-12
- Established: 1963
- Superintendent: Justin Denius
- Schools: 2

Students and staff
- Students: 1,161 (as of 2007-08)
- Teachers: 57.8 (FTE) (as of 2007-08)
- Staff: 75.0 (FTE) (as of 2007-08)
- Student–teacher ratio: 20.1 (as of 2007-08)
- Athletic conference: Ohio Valley Athletic Conference
- District mascot: Zeplin
- Colors: Green, Gold, White

Other information
- Website: https://www.gozeps.org/

Noble Local School District is the largest school district in Noble County, Ohio. It has two schools, Shenandoah Elementary and Shenandoah High. The campus is in Sarahsville, Ohio.
