= Cambridge City School District =

School district in Ohio

Address
- 518 South 8th Street Cambridge, Guernsey County, Ohio, 43725; United States
- Coordinates: 40.0191°N 81.5911°W

District information
- Grades: K - 12
- Superintendent: Dan Coffman
- NCES District ID: 3904369

Students and staff
- Enrollment: 2,585 (2011-2012)
- Staff: 106.00 (on an FTE basis)
- Student–teacher ratio: 17.65

Other information
- Website: cambridgecityschools.org

The Cambridge City School District is a public school district in Guernsey County, Ohio, United States, based in Cambridge, Ohio. The district currently consists of two elementary schools, one middle school, and one high school. The school's colors are blue and white and their mascot is a Bobcat.

== Schools ==
The Cambridge City School District has two elementary schools, one middle school, and one high school.

=== Elementary schools ===
- Cambridge Primary School
- Cambridge Intermediate School

=== Middle school ===
- Cambridge Middle School

=== High school ===
- Cambridge High School

== See also ==
- East Central Ohio ESC
