= Chad Brinker =

American football player (born 1979)

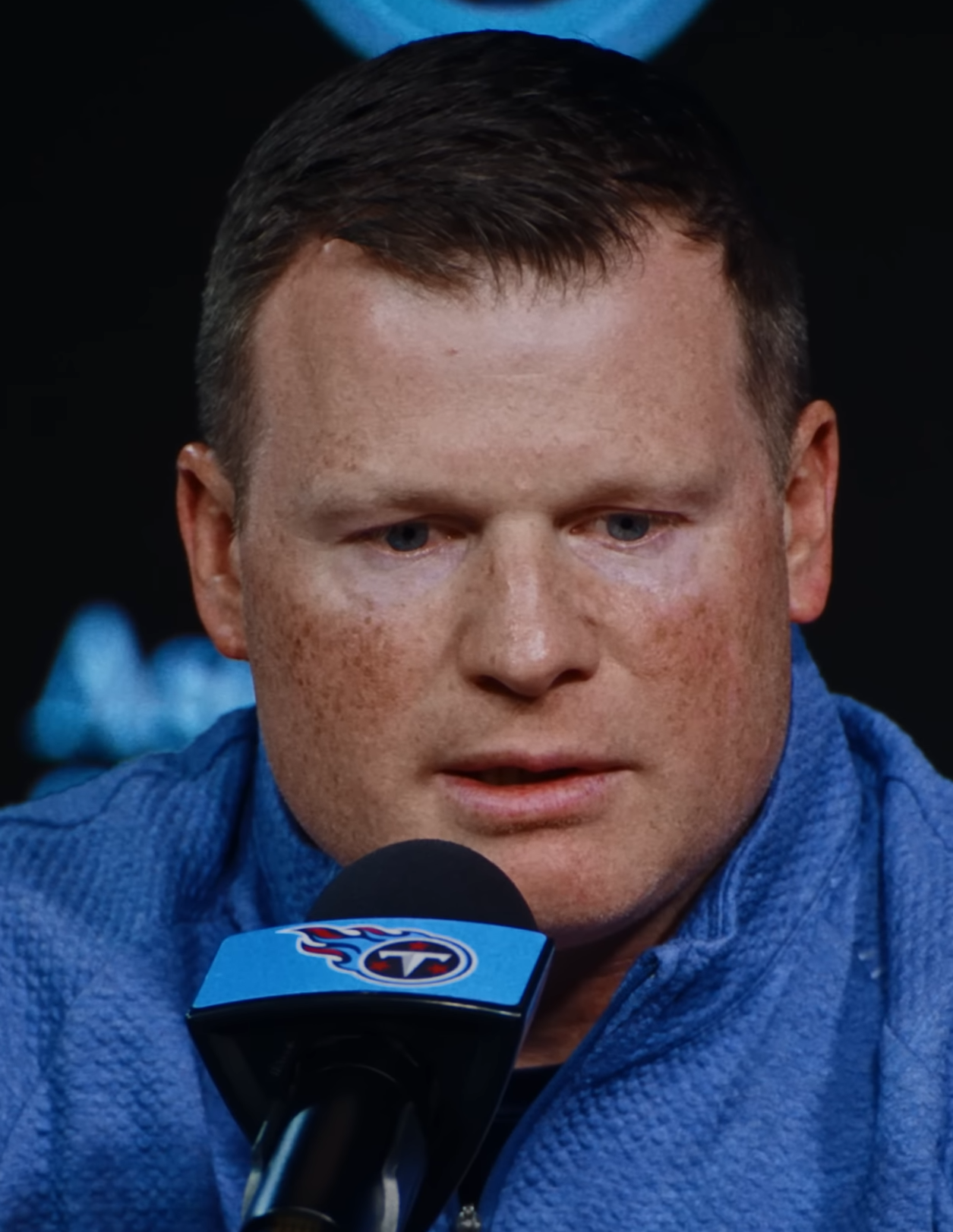
- Brinker in 2025

Personal information
- Born: November 5, 1979 (age 47); Martins Ferry, Ohio, U.S.
- Listed height: 5 ft 10 in (1.78 m)
- Listed weight: 205 lb (93 kg)

Career information
- Position: Running back
- High school: Martins Ferry
- College: Ohio (1998–2002)
- NFL draft: 2003: undrafted

Career history

Playing
- New York Jets (2003–2004)*; Cologne Centurions (2004)
- * Offseason or practice squad member only

Coaching
- Westerville Central High School (c. 2008) Assistant coach

Operations
- Green Bay Packers (2009–2022); Scouting intern (2009); Scouting assistant (2010–2011); Pro scout (2012–2017); Assistant director of pro scouting/salary cap analyst (2018–2020); Personnel/football administration executive (2021–2022); Tennessee Titans (2023–2025); Assistant general manager (2023); President of football operations (2024–2025)

Awards and highlights
- Super Bowl champion (XLV); First-team All-MAC (2002); Second-team All-MAC (2000)

Chad Brinker (born November 5, 1979) is an American professional football executive and former running back who most recently served as the president of football operations for the Tennessee Titans of the National Football League (NFL). He played college football for the Ohio Bobcats and later was a member of the New York Jets and played with the Cologne Centurions of NFL Europe. Before working with the Titans, he served as an executive and scout for the Green Bay Packers.

== Early life ==
Brinker was born on November 5, 1979, in Martins Ferry, Ohio. His father was a coal miner. He grew up playing football and was a standout running back at Martins Ferry High School, where he also competed in track and field, baseball and basketball. He lettered all four years with the football team and became a starter as a sophomore. He totaled 3,984 rushing yards and 51 touchdowns in his stint at Martins Ferry, placing second all-time in school history in the former. He was a first-team All-Ohio Valley Athletic Conference (OVAC), first-team all-valley, first-team all-district and first-team all-state choice after both his junior and senior years and was the district offensive player of the year as a senior, as well as the district nominee for the Ohio Mr. Football award and a USA Today All-American.

Brinker ran for 2,024 yards as a senior, which included a 319-yard, seven touchdown-performance against Indian Valley in only two quarters of play. He was selected to the Rudy Mumley OVAC All-Star Charity Football Classic following his senior season. He was also an all-state selection in track and field and an All-OVAC performer in basketball. He was inducted into the OVAC Hall of Fame in 2014.

== College career ==
Brinker enrolled at Ohio University in 1998, being a redshirt for the Ohio Bobcats football team that year. He ended up winning four varsity letters for the Bobcats. His coach described him as the most hard-working player on the team and one of the team's fastest players, and as a sophomore, he had a "touchdown trifecta" – scoring a rushing touchdown, receiving touchdown, and throwing for a touchdown in an upset defeat of Minnesota.

Early in the 2001 season, Brinker's junior year, he started to suffer from severe headaches and blurred vision. He kept his condition private and continued playing, running for 140 yards against Iowa State. By the fourth game of the season, against Toledo, his condition had worsened, and after running for 73 yards on 11 attempts, he left the game in the fourth quarter. He said that "I remember losing peripheral vision and just having the excruciating pain in my head and I guess I was forgetting plays and stuff. So my teammates are the ones that told the doctor that 'I think Chad's concussed, there's something wrong with him.'" He underwent a CAT scan, which discovered an arachnoid cyst by his brain. Afterwards, Brinker had to have surgery: a three-hour operation, which required drilling a hole in his skull, was successful in removing the cyst.

Brinker decided to continue to play football after his brain surgery. He began training three months after the surgery, and, with the clearance of doctors, he returned to the football team for the 2002 season. As a senior, he ran for 1,099 yards and 10 touchdowns. He concluded his tenure with the Bobcats having run for 2,826 yards and 27 touchdowns while having been named All-Mid-American Conference (MAC) twice, with his rushing touchdowns total placing fourth in school history and rushing yards placing fifth. He was invited to the Hula Bowl all-star game following his senior season.

== Professional career ==
After not being selected in the 2003 NFL draft, Brinker signed with the New York Jets as an undrafted free agent. He played for the team in preseason, scoring two touchdowns, but was later released prior to the regular season, on August 26, 2003. He later re-signed with the team on January 6, 2004, for the 2004 season. He was sent to NFL Europe to play with the Cologne Centurions during the NFL offseason, where he played two games and ran 15 times for 86 yards. However, he was injured with the Centurions and then released by the Jets on May 10, 2004.

After his playing career, Brinker worked for a time as a radio color analyst on Ohio Bobcats football games and later was an assistant football coach at Westerville Central High School.

== Executive career ==
In 2008, Brinker met with former Jets general manager Terry Bradway, who suggested to Brinker the possibility of working in an NFL front office. He later met Green Bay Packers scout Shaun Herock, who suggested applying to be an intern with the team's scouting department. He spent 2009 as an intern with the Packers, then was hired as a scouting assistant in 2010. That year, he won a Super Bowl ring when the Packers defeated the Pittsburgh Steelers in Super Bowl XLV. After two years as an assistant, he was promoted to pro scout in 2012. Then, after six seasons in that position, he received another promotion, to assistant director of pro scouting and salary cap analyst, in 2018. He later served in the position of personnel/football administration executive from 2021 to 2022. During his time with the Packers, Brinker also studied at the Kellogg School of Management of Northwestern University and received a Master of Business Administration (MBA) degree.

In 2023, Brinker left the Packers and was hired by the Tennessee Titans as assistant general manager to Ran Carthon. He was promoted to president of football operations in 2024. After Carthon was fired following the 2024 season, Brinker was announced as being given full control of the roster, a role which ProFootballTalk described as being de facto general manager. He was also named in charge of searching for the team's next general manager, a position that will end up reporting to him. In January 2025, Brinker hired Mike Borgonzi as the Titans' new general manager. On April 28, 2026, Brinker stepped down from his position.

== Personal life ==
Brinker is married and has three daughters.
