= Frontier High School =

Frontier High School may refer to:

- Frontier Central High School (New York) — Hamburg, New York
- Frontier High School (Bakersfield, California) — Bakersfield, California
- Frontier High School (Camarillo, California) — Camarillo, California
- Frontier High School (Whittier, California)— Continuation school in the Whittier Union High School District
- Frontier High School (Elizabeth, Colorado) — Elizabeth, Colorado
- Frontier High School (Fort Collins, Colorado) — Fort Collins, Colorado
- Frontier High School (Ohio) — New Matamoras, Ohio
- Frontier High School (Oklahoma) — Red Rock, Oklahoma
- Frontier Regional School — South Deerfield, Massachusetts
- Camden-Frontier High School — Camden, Michigan
- Frontier Junior-Senior High School — Chalmers, Indiana
