= Barnesville Exempted Village School District =

School district in Ohio, United States

Address
- 210 West Church Street Barnesville, Ohio, 43713; United States

District information
- Type: Public
- Grades: PK–12
- Schools: 3
- NCES District ID: 3904520

Students and staff
- Students: 1,319 (2025–2026)
- Teachers: 65.41 (on an FTE basis) (2025–2026)
- Staff: 81.51 (on an FTE basis) (2025–2026)
- Student–teacher ratio: 20.17 (2025–2026)

Other information
- Website: www.barnesville.k12.oh.us

Barnesville Exempted Village Schools serves the village of Barnesville, Ohio, United States, and the surrounding area.

== Board of education ==
- Rob Miller, President
- Scott Baker, Vice President
- Matt King, Treasurer
- Dennis Huntsman
- Sam Lucas
- Kenny Triplett
- Angela Hannahs, Superintendent

== Administration ==
School/Department	Title	Administrator
School district	Superintendent	Angela Hannahs
High School	Principal	Ron Clark
Middle School	Principal	Casey Mayo
Elementary School	Principal	Clinton Abbott
Instruction and Student Services	Director	Dr. Rebecca Hannahs
Support Services	Director	John Blattler
Technology	Director	Andrew Daugherty

== Renovations ==
In 2002, the village of Barnesville saw a rebirth of its schools. The high school, located on the eastern edge of Barnesville, was remodeled to expand classroom areas and improve appearances, as well as the addition of a new administrative wing. A new middle school was built beside the high school to rectify the crowded school downtown. The elementary school was remodeled and an older section of the building was removed. The renovations and new school left the school board in a weak financial state, it is now using fundraisers to increase its stability.

== Athletics ==
The school's sports teams' mascot is the shamrock.

== See also ==
- Barnesville High School (Barnesville, Ohio)
- East Central Ohio ESC
