= Cambridge High School (Cambridge, Ohio) =

Location
- 1401 Deerpath Drive; Cambridge, Ohio 43725; United States
- Coordinates: 40°3′10.3″N 81°35′4.8″W

Information
- Type: Public high school
- School district: Cambridge City Schools
- Superintendent: Dan Coffman
- Principal: Bob Baier
- Teaching staff: 34.79 (FTE)
- Grades: 9-12
- Enrollment: 488 (2023-2024)
- Student to teacher ratio: 14.03
- Colors: Blue and White
- Athletics conference: Buckeye 8 Athletic League; Ohio Valley Athletic Conference
- Mascot: Bobcats
- Team name: Bobcats
- Website: www.cambridgecityschools.org/cambridgehighschool_home.aspx

Cambridge High School is a public high school in Cambridge, Ohio, United States. It is the only high school in the Cambridge City School District. Athletic teams compete as the Cambridge Bobcats in the Ohio High School Athletic Association as a member of the Buckeye 8 Athletic League as well as the Ohio Valley Athletic Conference.

== OHSAA State Championships ==
- Boys Golf – 1994

== Notable alumni ==
- Doug Donley - former wide receiver for the Dallas Cowboys
- Geno Ford - former men's basketball coach for the Kent State Golden Flashes and Bradley Braves
