= Harrison Central High School (Ohio) =

Harrison Central Junior/Senior High School
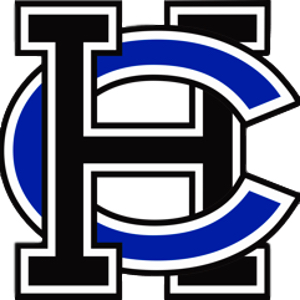

Location
- 100 Huskies Way; Cadiz, Ohio 43907; United States

Information
- Type: Public, Coeducational high school
- Established: 1999
- School district: Harrison Hills City School District
- Superintendent: Duran Morgan
- Principal: Ken Parker
- Teaching staff: 33.17 (FTE)
- Grades: 7-12
- Enrollment: 568 (2023-2024)
- Student to teacher ratio: 17.12
- Campus type: Rural
- Colors: Black, silver, and blue
- Athletics conference: Buckeye 8 Athletic League; Ohio Valley Athletic Conference
- Sports: Football, Wrestling, Baseball, Volleyball, Cross Country, Golf, Basketball, Softball, Track & Field, Soccer, and Bowling
- Team name: Huskies
- Newspaper: Husky Chronicles
- Yearbook: Iditarod
- Alumni: Harrison Central Alumni Association
- Assistant Principal: Justin Clifford
- Assistant Principal: Todd Dunlap
- Athletic Director: Ray Hibbs
- Website: www.hhcsd.org/hchs

Harrison Central Junior/Senior High School is located in Cadiz, Ohio, United States. It is the only high school in the Harrison Hills City School District. Athletic teams are known as the Huskies, and they compete in the Ohio High School Athletic Association as a member of the Buckeye 8 Athletic League as well as the Ohio Valley Athletic Conference.

The school was established in 1999 from the consolidation of Cadiz High School (Cardinals), Jewett-Scio High School (Vikings), and Freeport Lakeland High School (Raiders).

== Campus ==
The Harrison Hills City School District opened its 216,000 square foot PK-12 facility in August 2019. The new centralized campus includes an elementary wing, middle school wing, high school wing, two gymnasiums, a 760-seat performing arts center, an artificial turf softball stadium, and an eight-lane track and field complex. The school district still retains the recently updated Mazeroski Field (Baseball) and stadium, Wagner Field (football) and stadium, and John W. Stephenson Center at the former high school.

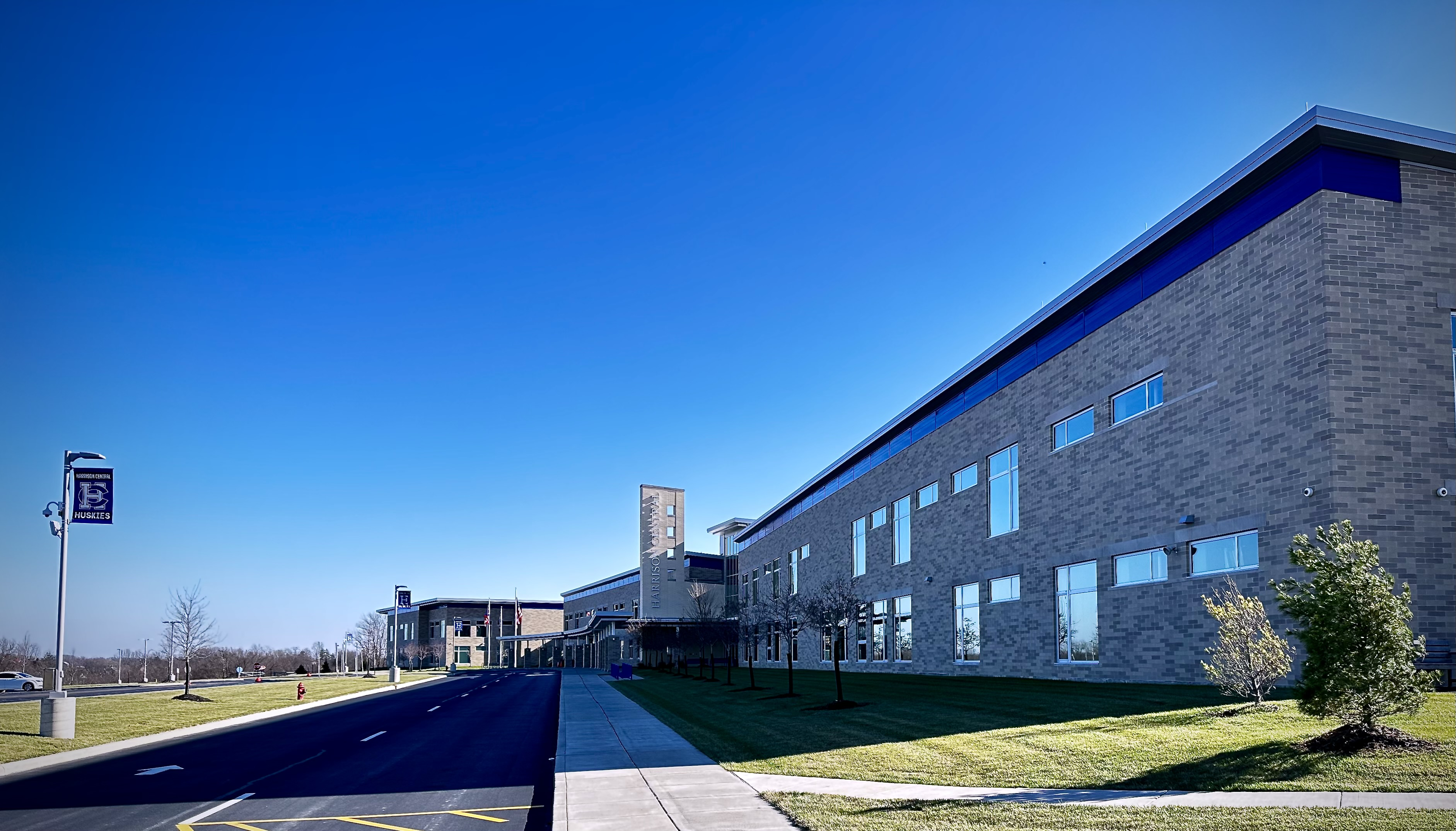
Harrison Central PK-12 Campus

Following the 2018/2019 academic year, the School District closed and demolished several former buildings, including the former Cadiz H.S./Harrison Central H.S., Jewett-Scio H.S./Harrison Jr. H.S./Harrison North Elementary, and Hopedale Elementary buildings. According to a recent article, the district plans to sell the former Westgate Elementary School in Cadiz to Harrison County.

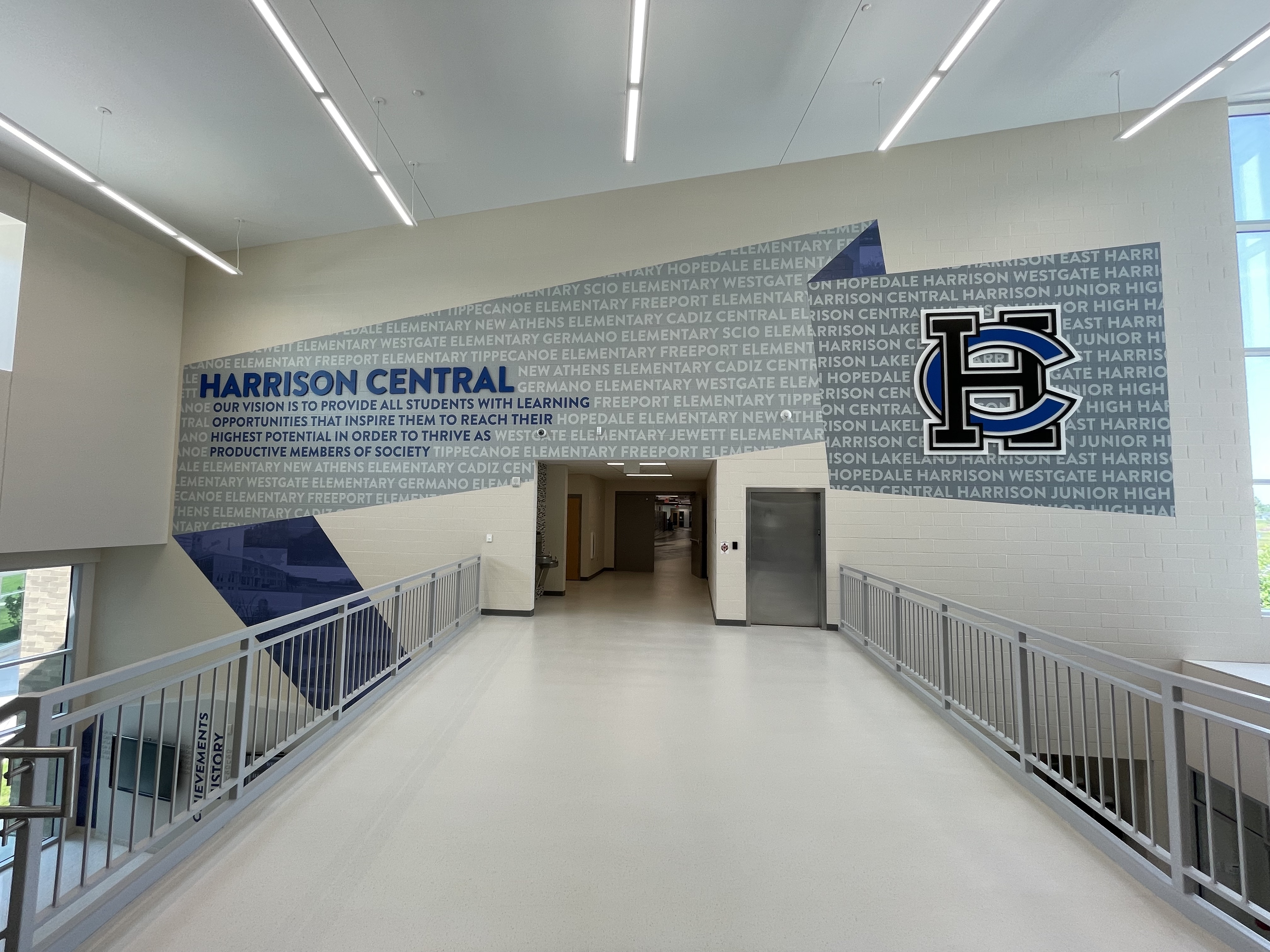
Respecting Harrison County's educational past.

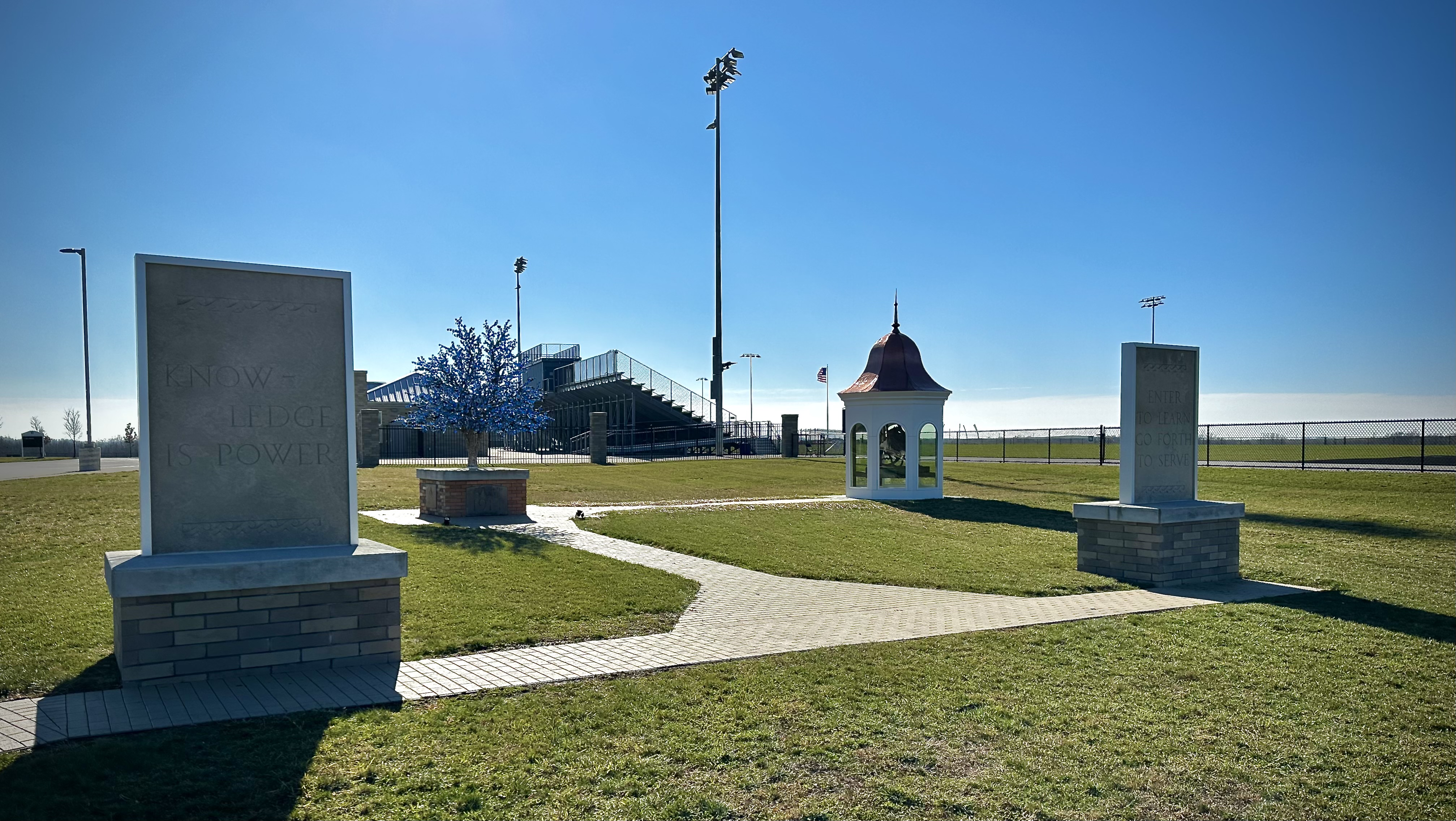
Tablets and bell tower from the former Harrison Central/Cadiz High School campus.

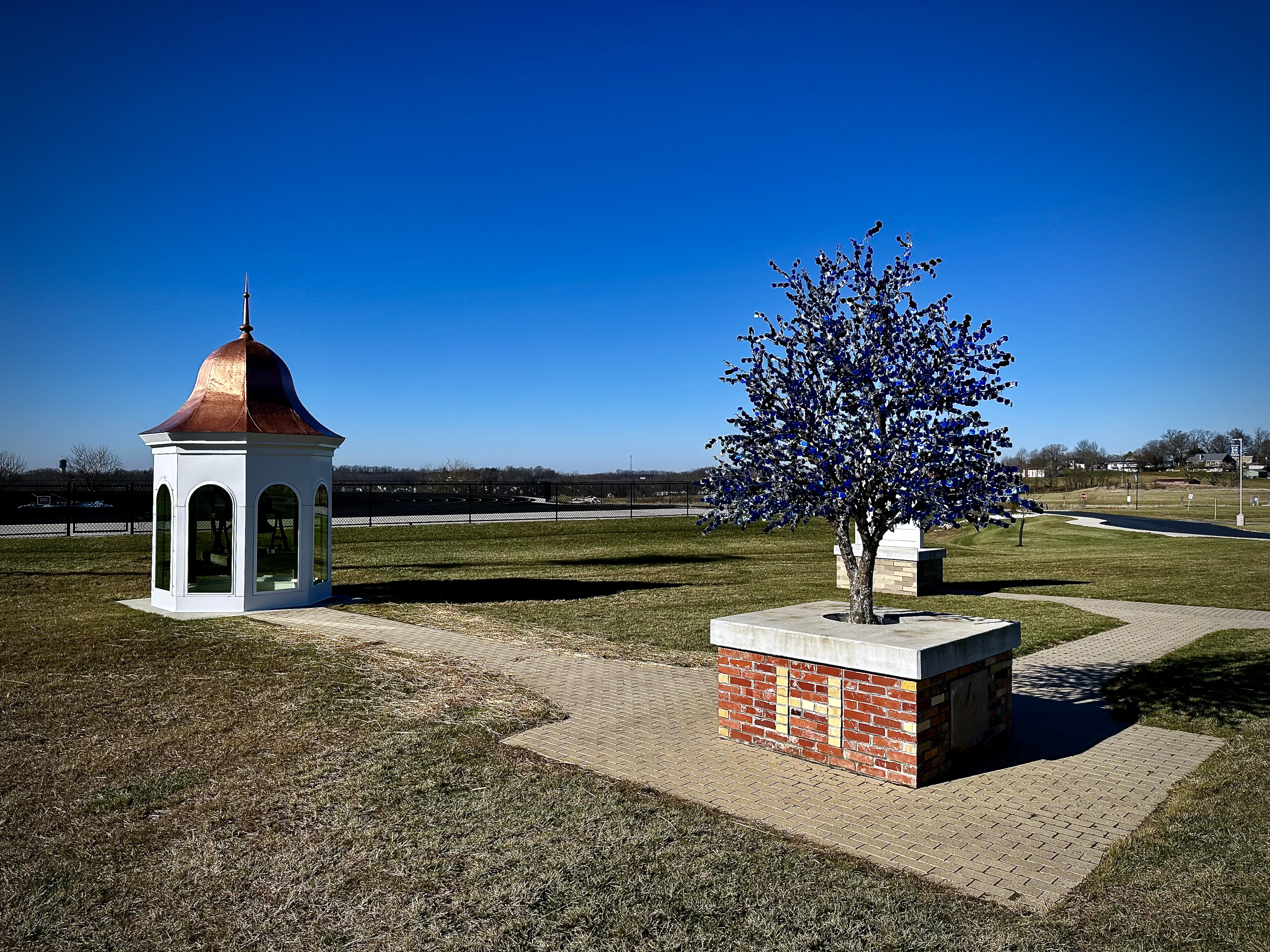
Celebrating our past, while building on our future.

== Academics and extracurricular activities ==
Harrison Central offers a wide variety of academic and extracurricular activities. The school offers Advanced Placement courses through the College Board as well as dual enrollment programs with local colleges and universities. Furthermore, they offer advanced courses in math, science, and the liberal arts as well as courses in art, theatre, music, agriculture, environmental science, technology, and the Industrial arts. Students can also take foreign language courses in Spanish, French, and American Sign Language.

Clubs and Organizations:

- Ohio Model United Nations
- Academic Challenge
- Band
- Choir
- FFA
- National Honor Society
- Student Council
- International Thespian Society (Theatre)

== Athletics ==
In athletics, Harrison Central is primarily a part of the Ohio Valley Athletic Conference in division AAAA. They are also a member of secondary conference, the Buckeye 8. Harrison Central's boys are OHSAA Class AAA, while its girls are OHSAA Class AA. Their athletic director is Ray Hibbs.

=== Offered sports include ===
- Football
- Wrestling
- Baseball
- Volleyball
- Cross country
- Golf
- Basketball
- Softball
- Track & field
- Soccer
- Bowling

=== State championships ===
- Boys wrestling - 1987

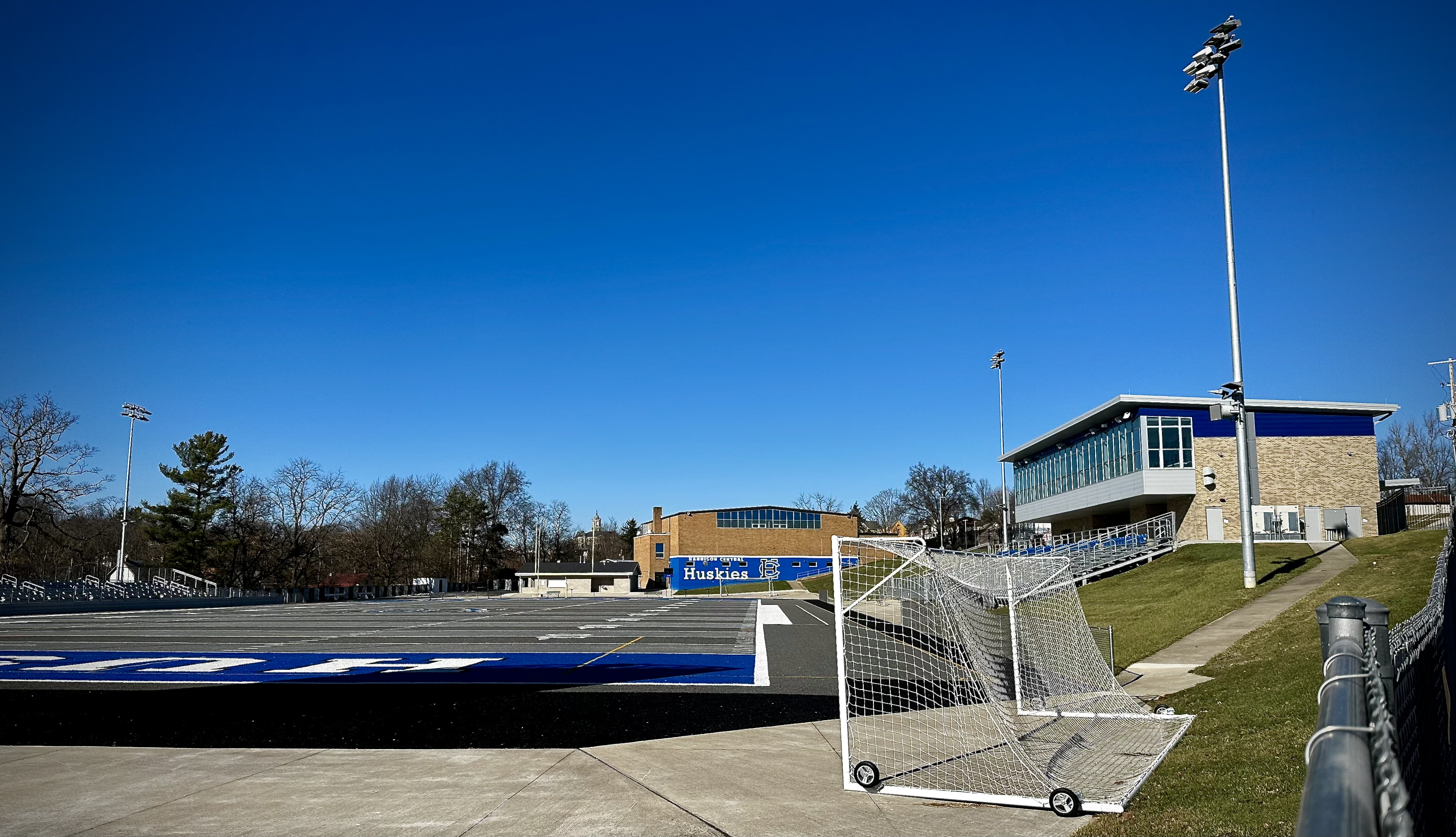
Harrison Central Wagner Field and Press Box

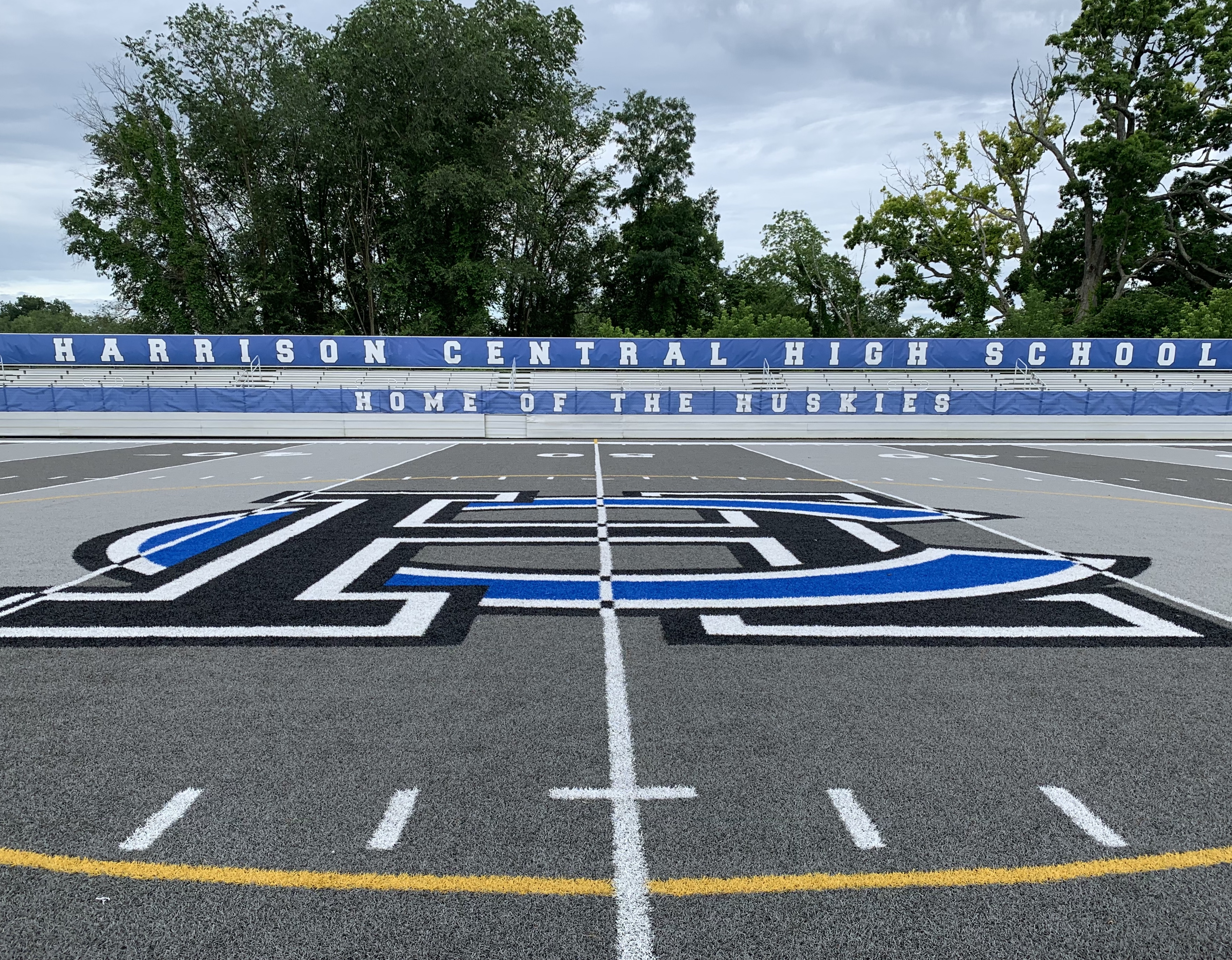
Wagner Field

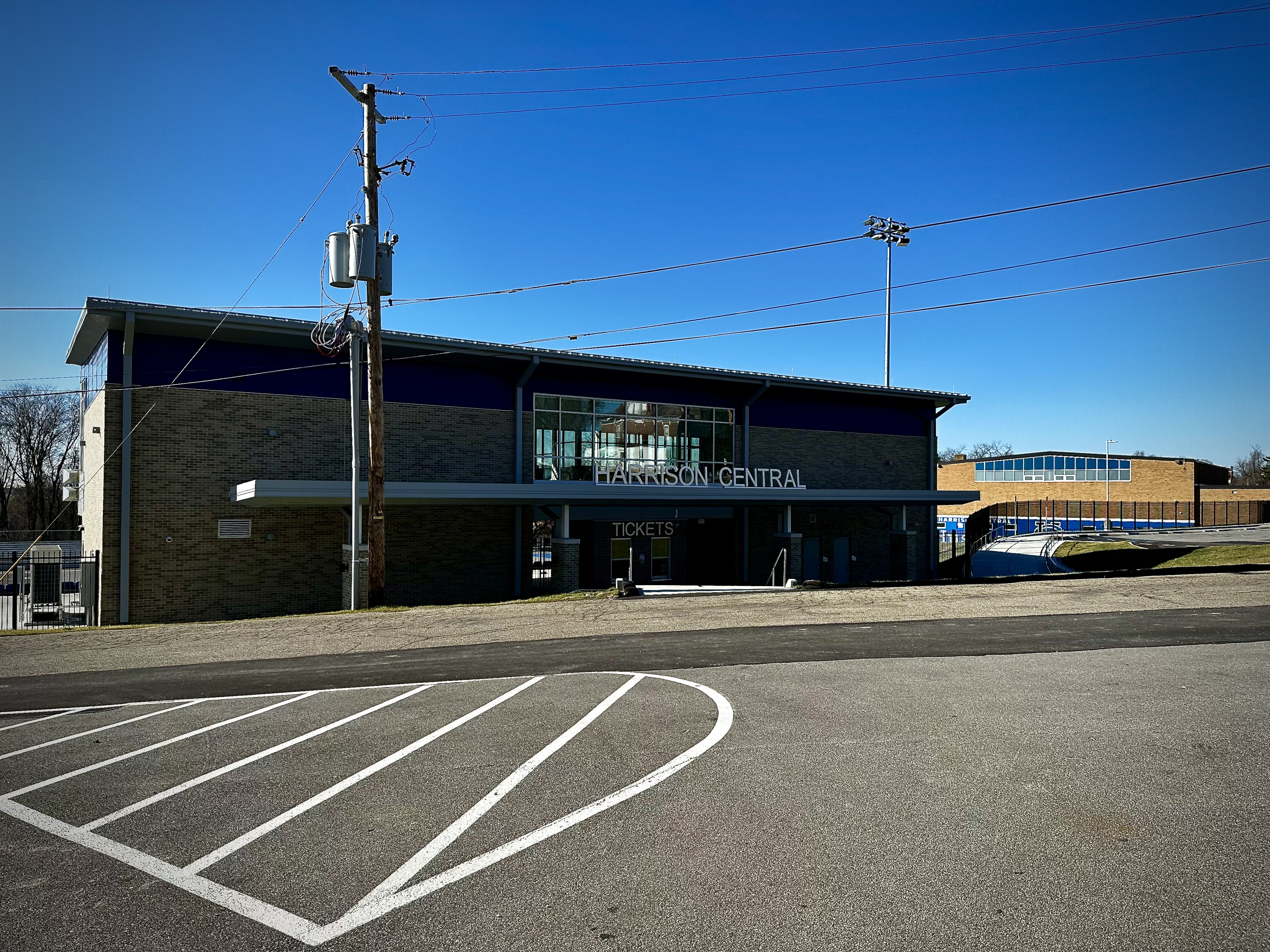
Harrison Central Press Box

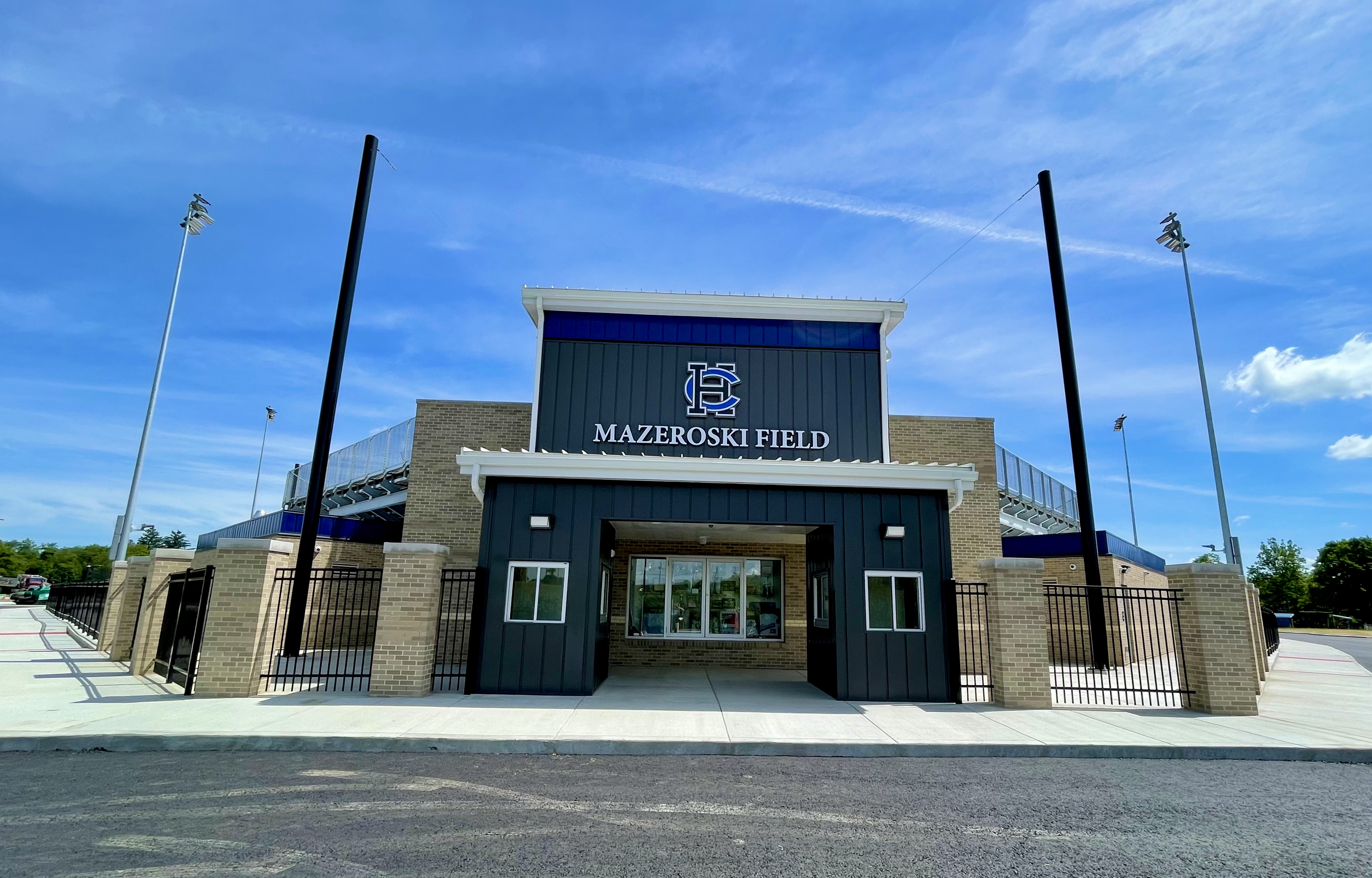
Mazeroski Field at Sally Buffalo Park

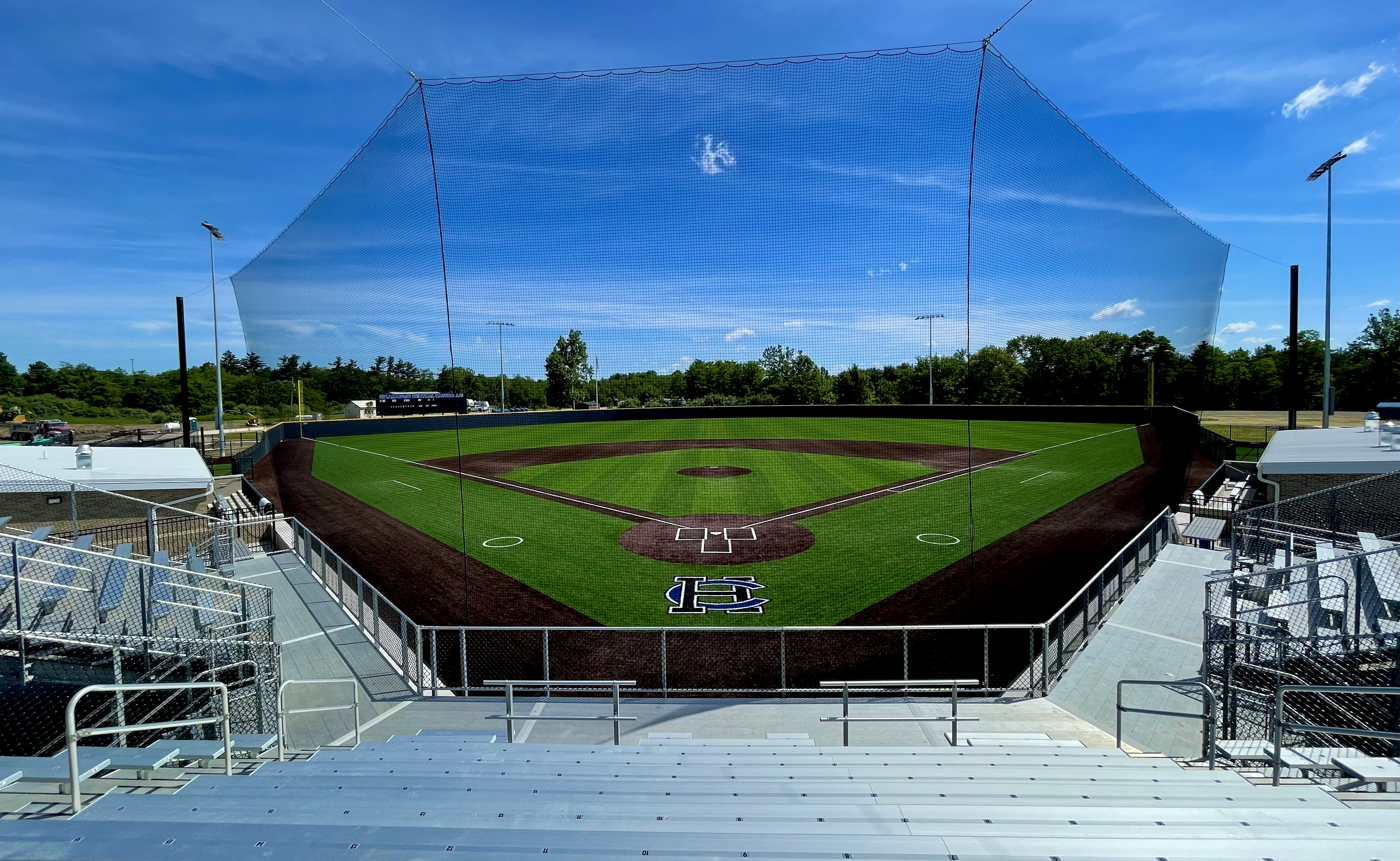
Mazeroski Field
