= Indian Creek Local School District =

School district in Ohio, United States

Coordinates: 40°22′38″N 80°42′23″W

The Indian Creek Local School District is a public school district based in Wintersville, Ohio, United States.

The district serves the villages of Wintersville, Bloomingdale, and Mingo Junction, the far western portion of Steubenville as well as unincorporated areas in central Jefferson County.

== Schools ==
- Grades 9-12
  - Indian Creek High School
- Grades 5-8
  - Indian Creek Middle School
- Preschool-Grade 4
  - Cross Creek Elementary
  - Indian Creek Hills Elementary

== See also ==
- List of school districts in Ohio
