= Jim Kerr (American football) =

American football player (1939–2008)

No. 43
- Position: Safety

Personal information
- Born: July 23, 1939; Colver, Pennsylvania, U.S.
- Died: May 27, 2008 (aged 68); Mount Pleasant, South Carolina, U.S.
- Listed height: 6 ft 0 in (1.83 m)
- Listed weight: 195 lb (88 kg)

Career information
- High school: St. Clairsville (OH)
- College: Penn State
- NFL draft: 1961: 7th round, 87th overall pick
- AFL draft: 1961: 19th round, 150th overall pick

Career history
- Washington Redskins (1961–1962)

Career NFL statistics
- Interceptions: 8
- Fumble recoveries: 1
- Sacks: 0.5
- Stats at Pro Football Reference

James Norman Kerr (July 23, 1939 – May 27, 2008) was an American professional football safety in the National Football League (NFL) for the Washington Redskins. He played college football at Penn State University and was drafted in the seventh round of the 1961 NFL draft. Kerr was also selected in the 19th round of the 1961 AFL draft by the New York Titans.

He died on May 27, 2008.
