= Bridgeport High School (Bridgeport, Ohio) =

Location
- 55707 Industrial Drive; Bridgeport, (Belmont County), Ohio 43912; United States
- Coordinates: 40.06917°N 80.77750°W

Information
- School type: Public, Secondary school
- Status: Operational
- School district: Bridgeport Exempted Village School District
- NCES District ID: 3904523
- Superintendent: Brent Ripley
- NCES School ID: 390452302128
- Principal: Jack Fisher
- Teaching staff: 18.00 (FTE)
- Grades: 9 through 12
- Gender: Coeducational
- Enrollment: 167 (2023-2024)
- Student to teacher ratio: 9.28
- Colors: Columbia blue; Black; White
- Athletics conference: Ohio Valley Athletic Conference
- Team name: Bulldogs
- Website: https://www.bridgeportschools.net/bridgeporthighschool_home.aspx

Bridgeport High School is a public high school in Bridgeport, Ohio. It is the only high school in the Bridgeport Exempted Village School District. Bridgeport plays in the Ohio Valley Athletic Conference. Their mascot is the Bulldog and the school colors are Columbia blue, black, and white (previously silver). The school moved to its current location at 55707 Industrial Dr. in January 2007. The new school complex houses all Pre-K - 12 students.

== OHSAA State Championships ==
- Boys Wrestling – 1959, 1988

== Notable alumni ==
- Johnny Blatnik - outfielder for the Philadelphia Phillies in 1948–1950 and St. Louis Cardinals in 1950. He had a .407 slugging percentage in his first season with Phillies. Played baseball at Bridgeport High School, and in the Bridgeport High School Sports Hall of Fame.
- Bobby Douglas - Iowa State University wrestling coach, Olympic wrestler and coach; Hall of Famer.
- Stan Goletz, pinch hitter for the Chicago White Sox in 1941.
- John Havlicek - forward for Ohio State University basketball, drafted by the National Football League's Cleveland Browns and the National Basketball Association's, Boston Celtics, Basketball Hall of Fame, NBA Finals most valuable player, NBA All-Star. He is the Celtics' all-time leader in points scored (26,395) and games played. He won 8 NBA titles with the Celtics and was elected to the Naismith Memorial Basketball Hall of Fame.
- Bill Jobko - linebacker for Ohio State University, drafted in the 1958 by the Los Angeles Rams, and played for them from 1958 to 1962. He also played for the Minnesota Vikings from 1963 to 1965 and the Atlanta Falcons in 1966.
- Joe Niekro - pitcher for West Liberty State College, Chicago Cubs, San Diego Padres, Detroit Tigers, Atlanta Braves, Houston Astros, New York Yankees, Minnesota Twins; 221 career major league wins.
- Phil Niekro - pitcher for the Atlanta Braves, New York Yankees, Cleveland Indians, Toronto Blue Jays; 318 career major league wins, National League Gold Glove winner, Baseball Hall of Fame.

== See also ==
- East Central Ohio ESC
