= New Lexington High School =

School in Ohio, United States

Coordinates: 39°43′44″N 82°12′42″W

Location
- 2547 Panther Drive; New Lexington, (Perry County), Ohio 43764; United States

Information
- Type: Public high school
- Principal: Tony Thorngate
- Teaching staff: 32.00 (FTE)
- Enrollment: 506 (2023–2024)
- Student to teacher ratio: 15.81
- Colors: Orange and black
- Athletics conference: Muskingum Valley League
- Nickname: Panthers

New Lexington High School is a public high school in New Lexington, Ohio, United States. It is the only high school in the New Lexington City School District. Their mascot is the Panthers.

== Sports ==
=== Football ===
The football program, currently headed by Coach Kevin Board, has historically played well. Reaching the playoffs seven times, the program won the 1970 state UPI poll championship and reached the quarterfinals in 2006. And the state semifinals in 2008.

Football coach Jim Rockwell built the program from the 1959 through 1976 seasons. His record during that time period was 144–27–8. The Panthers won two state championships and 10 MVL championships in the 18 years with Rockwell at the helm. In 1970 Coach Rockwell was voted the Ohio Class AA Coach of the Year and his son Jim “Little Rock” Rockwell was voted the Ohio Class AA Back of the Year as the Panthers won the 1970 Class AA State Championship. In 1984 New Lexington Stadium was renamed Jim Rockwell Stadium in the coach's honor.

=== Athletics ===
In 1989 the New Lexington boys' athletics team won the Muskingum Valley League Championship and included several individual league champions, one of whom qualified for state competition. The team had gone undefeated in the league throughout the season.

The following year's team also won the championship without being defeated. Two individuals and a relay team qualified for state competition.

== Notable alumni ==
- Mell G. Underwood, politician, judge
