= Martins Ferry High School =

Location
- 5000 Ayers-Limestone Road; Martins Ferry, Ohio 43943; United States; 40°6′38″N 80°43′36″W

Information
- Type: Public high school
- School district: Martins Ferry City School District
- Superintendent: Joe Mamone
- Grades: 9-12
- Campus type: Small Suburb
- Colors: Purple and White
- Athletics conference: Buckeye 8 Athletic League; Ohio Valley Athletic Conference
- Team name: Purple Riders
- Rival: Bellaire High School and Saint Clairsville High School
- Yearbook: The Ferrian
- Website: mfcsd.org/martinsferryhighschool_home.aspx

Martins Ferry High School is a public high school in Martins Ferry, Ohio, United States. It is the only high school in the Martins Ferry City School District. Athletic teams compete as the Martins Ferry Purple Riders in the Ohio High School Athletic Association as a member of the Buckeye 8 Athletic League as well as the Ohio Valley Athletic Conference.

The Martins Ferry City School District has median household income of $23,960, thus making the school eligible for a Title I program, including access to state and federal assistance to help low-income and at risk students. The head school administrator, Joe Mamone, oversees the school's staff, including thirty full-time "equivalent" teachers serving the student body with an average class size of 17.8. The majority of students enrolled are White, making up about eighty-three percent of all students.

== Athletics ==
=== State championships ===
- Baseball – 1930
- Boys basketball – 1941
- Football - 1941

== Notable alumni ==
- Lou Groza - former professional football player in the National Football League (NFL)
- Alex Groza - former professional basketball player in the National Basketball Association (NBA)
- Chad Brinker - former professional football player and team president in the National Football League (NFL)
