= Morgan High School (McConnelsville, Ohio) =

Location
- 800 Raider Drive; McConnelsville, Ohio; 39.613083°N 81.819022°W

Information
- Type: Public
- Established: 1966
- School district: Morgan Local Schools
- Principal: Matthew Barrett
- Grades: 9-12
- Colors: Navy, gray and red
- Athletics conference: Muskingum Valley League
- Team name: Raiders
- Website: https://mhs.morganschools.org/

Morgan High School is a public high school in McConnelsville, Ohio, United States. It is the only high school in the Morgan Local School District.

== History ==
Morgan County was the first county in the United States to completely consolidate its various high schools into one school system. Morgan County was also the first school district in the US to form a comprehensive curriculum consisting of general, college preparatory, and vocational education, all within one county.

The school is located near McConnelsville, Ohio, along the scenic banks of the Muskingum River.

The Morgan Local School District received matching funds in the Vocational Act of 1963. These funds allowed the school officials to plan and create a new Trade and Industrial Vocational Program, comprising nine trades, to reside in its own building next to the proposed new high school, which opened in the fall of 1966.

With the new school came a new name and new colors for everyone in Morgan County. The "Morgan Raiders" became Morgan's official team name. The school's new colors were silver-gray and blue as the dominant colors, with red and white as the secondary colors. The words to the alma mater and all school songs were selected by Gregory F. Trocchia, the school's music supervisor, and approved by the board of education.

In advance of the school's opening, the newly formed Morgan Raider Marching Band rehearsed twice weekly all summer. Performing several times in and around Morgan County prior to the new school's opening, the new band continued its efforts to raise funds for their new uniforms, first worn for an appearance before then President, L.B. Johnson in Lancaster, Ohio.

On October 1, 1966, nearly 2,000 people assembled for the outdoor dedication ceremony, while many more viewed the program via closed circuit television in various rooms inside the newly built school.

In the first school year, 1966–1967, there were 208 freshmen, 189 sophomore, 200 junior class members and 156 seniors enrolled.

The first yearbook annual was called the Morhi and the following year was renamed the Raider.
