= Bloomingdale, Ohio =

- Village
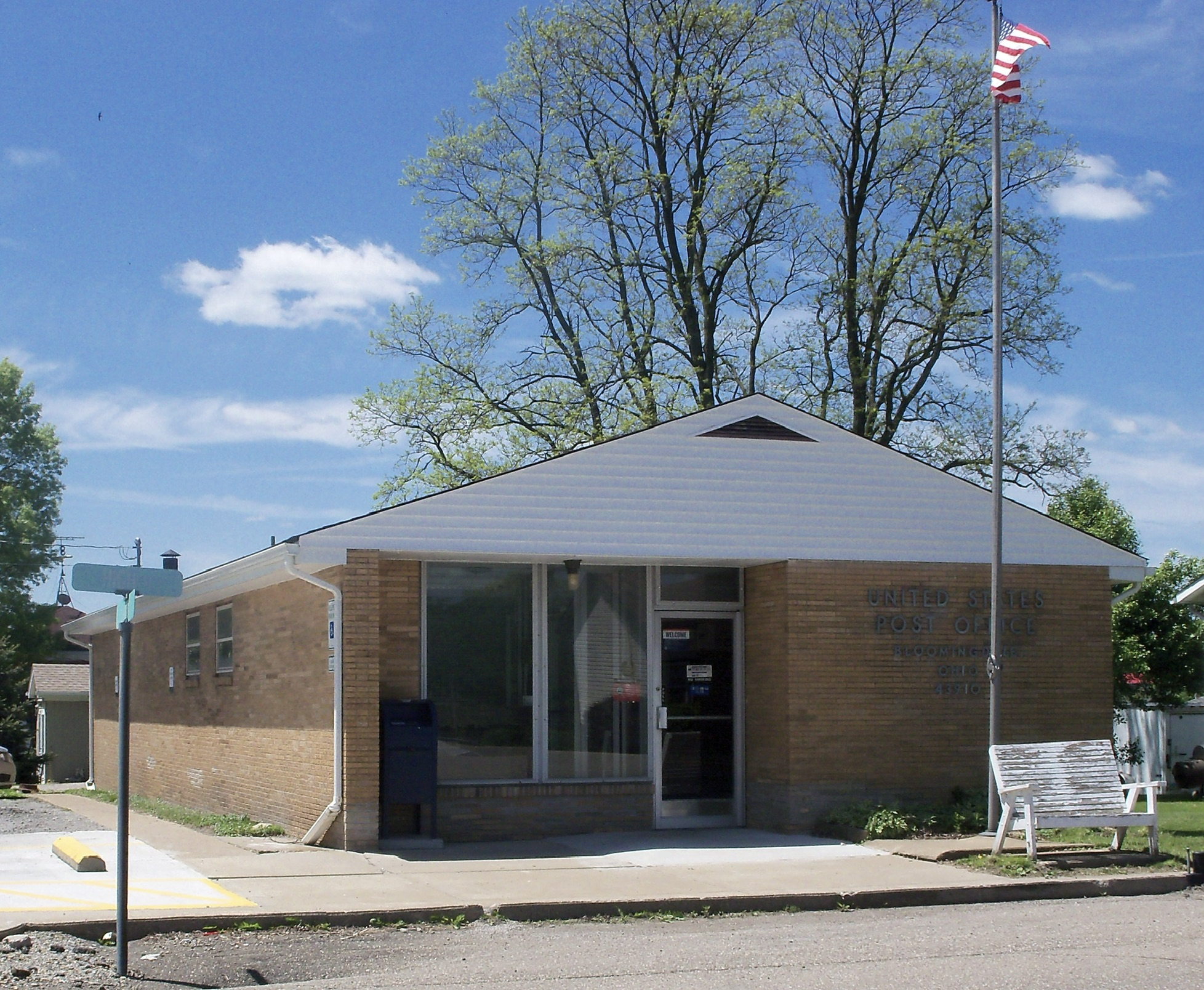
- Bloomingdale Post Office

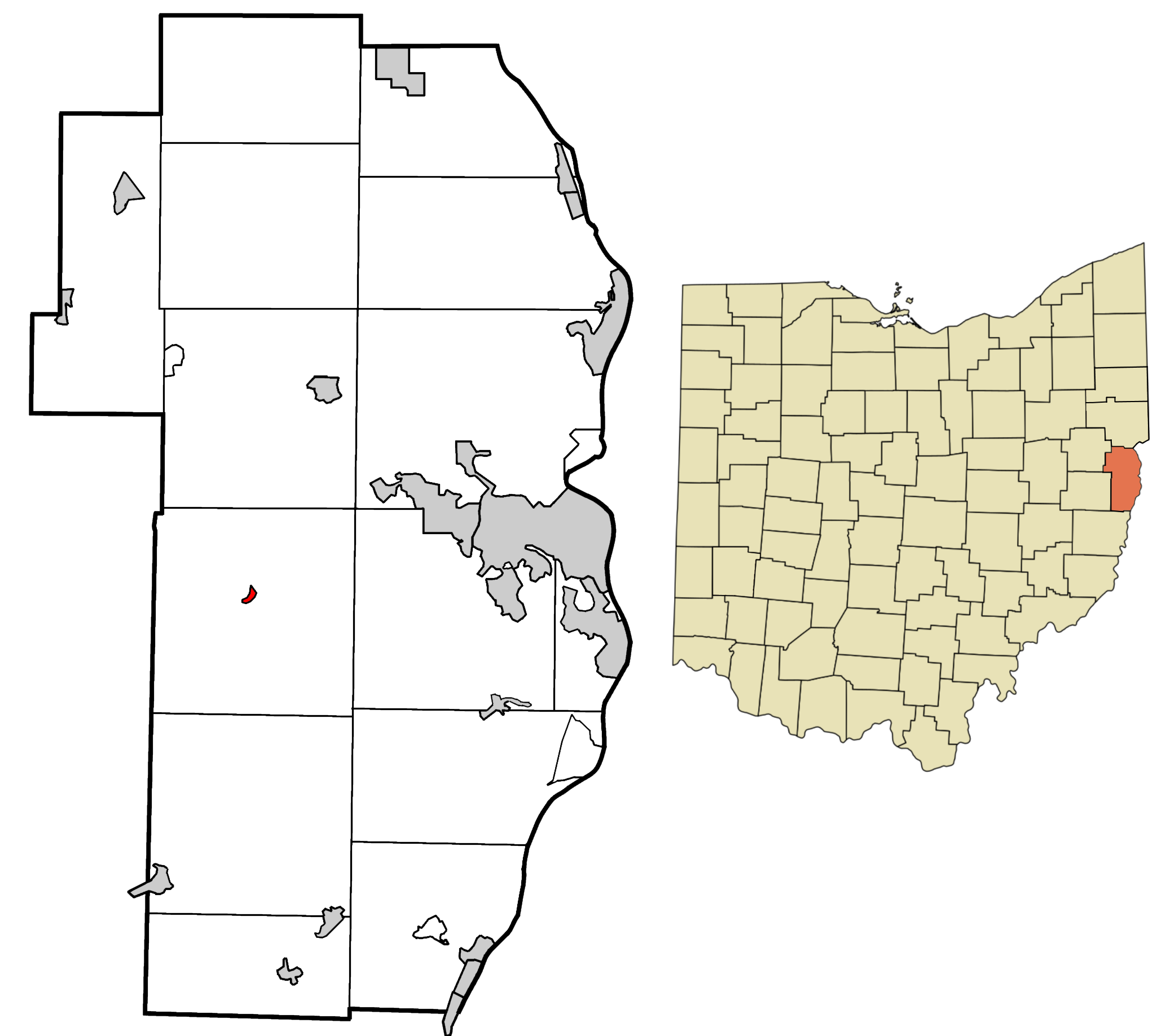
- Location of Bloomingdale in Jefferson County, Ohio

- Location within Ohio Location within the United States
- Coordinates: 40°20′32″N 80°49′04″W
- Country: United States
- State: Ohio
- County: Jefferson
- Township: Wayne

Area
  - Total: 0.089 sq mi (0.23 km^{2})
  - Land: 0.089 sq mi (0.23 km^{2})
  - Water: 0 sq mi (0.00 km^{2})
- Elevation: 1,260 ft (380 m)

Population (2020)
  - Total: 145
  - Estimate (2023): 135
  - Density: 1,641.0/sq mi (633.58/km^{2})
- Time zone: UTC-5 (Eastern (EST))
  - Summer (DST): UTC-4 (EDT)
- ZIP code: 43910
- Area code: 740
- FIPS code: 39-07202
- GNIS feature ID: 2398137

Bloomingdale is a village in Jefferson County, Ohio, United States. The population was 145 at the 2020 census. It is part of the Weirton–Steubenville metropolitan area. Bloomingdale is the site of a Camaldolese monastic community at Holy Family Hermitage, part of the Congregation of Monte Corona.

== History ==
Bloomingdale was originally called Bloomfield, and under the latter name was laid out in 1816. A post office called Bloomingdale has been in operation since 1822.

== Geography ==
According to the United States Census Bureau, the village has a total area of 0.09 square miles (0.23 km^{2}), all land.

== Demographics ==
Historical population
Census	Pop.	Note	%±
1850	184		—
1870	146		—
1880	175		19.9%
1890	173		−1.1%
1900	189		9.2%
1910	185		−2.1%
1920	191		3.2%
1930	265		38.7%
1940	339		27.9%
1950	324		−4.4%
1960	284		−12.3%
1970	289		1.8%
1980	254		−12.1%
1990	227		−10.6%
2000	221		−2.6%
2010	202		−8.6%
2020	145		−28.2%
2023 (est.)	135	▼	−6.9%
U.S. Decennial Census

=== 2010 census ===
As of the census of 2010, there were 202 people, 80 households, and 60 families living in the village. The population density was 2,244.4 inhabitants per square mile (866.6/km^{2}). There were 86 housing units at an average density of 955.6 per square mile (369.0/km^{2}). The racial makeup of the village was 98.0% White, 0.5% African American, 0.5% Native American, and 1.0% from two or more races.

There were 80 households, of which 26.3% had children under the age of 18 living with them, 56.3% were married couples living together, 13.8% had a female householder with no husband present, 5.0% had a male householder with no wife present, and 25.0% were non-families. 22.5% of all households were made up of individuals, and 13.8% had someone living alone who was 65 years of age or older. The average household size was 2.53 and the average family size was 2.83.

The median age in the village was 41.5 years. 18.8% of residents were under the age of 18; 10.3% were between the ages of 18 and 24; 27.1% were from 25 to 44; 29.2% were from 45 to 64; and 14.4% were 65 years of age or older. The gender makeup of the village was 53.0% male and 47.0% female.

=== 2000 census ===
As of the census of 2000, there were 221 people, 82 households, and 61 families living in the village. The population density was 2,054.9 inhabitants per square mile (793.4/km^{2}). There were 88 housing units at an average density of 818.2 per square mile (315.9/km^{2}). The racial makeup of the village was 97.74% White, 0.45% Asian, 0.45% Pacific Islander, and 1.36% from other races.

There were 82 households, out of which 34.1% had children under the age of 18 living with them, 58.5% were married couples living together, 17.1% had a female householder with no husband present, and 24.4% were non-families. 19.5% of all households were made up of individuals, and 17.1% had someone living alone who was 65 years of age or older. The average household size was 2.70 and the average family size was 3.16.

In the village, the population was spread out, with 29.4% under the age of 18, 5.4% from 18 to 24, 26.2% from 25 to 44, 23.1% from 45 to 64, and 15.8% who were 65 years of age or older. The median age was 36 years. For every 100 females there were 92.2 males. For every 100 females age 18 and over, there were 85.7 males.

The median income for a household in the village was $46,667, and the median income for a family was $47,500. Males had a median income of $32,679 versus $25,208 for females. The per capita income for the village was $17,610. About 3.9% of families and 4.3% of the population were below the poverty line, including 11.3% of those under the age of eighteen and 2.9% of those 65 or over.

== Education ==
Public education in the village of Bloomingdale is provided by the Indian Creek Local School District.
