= Wintersville, Ohio =

- Village
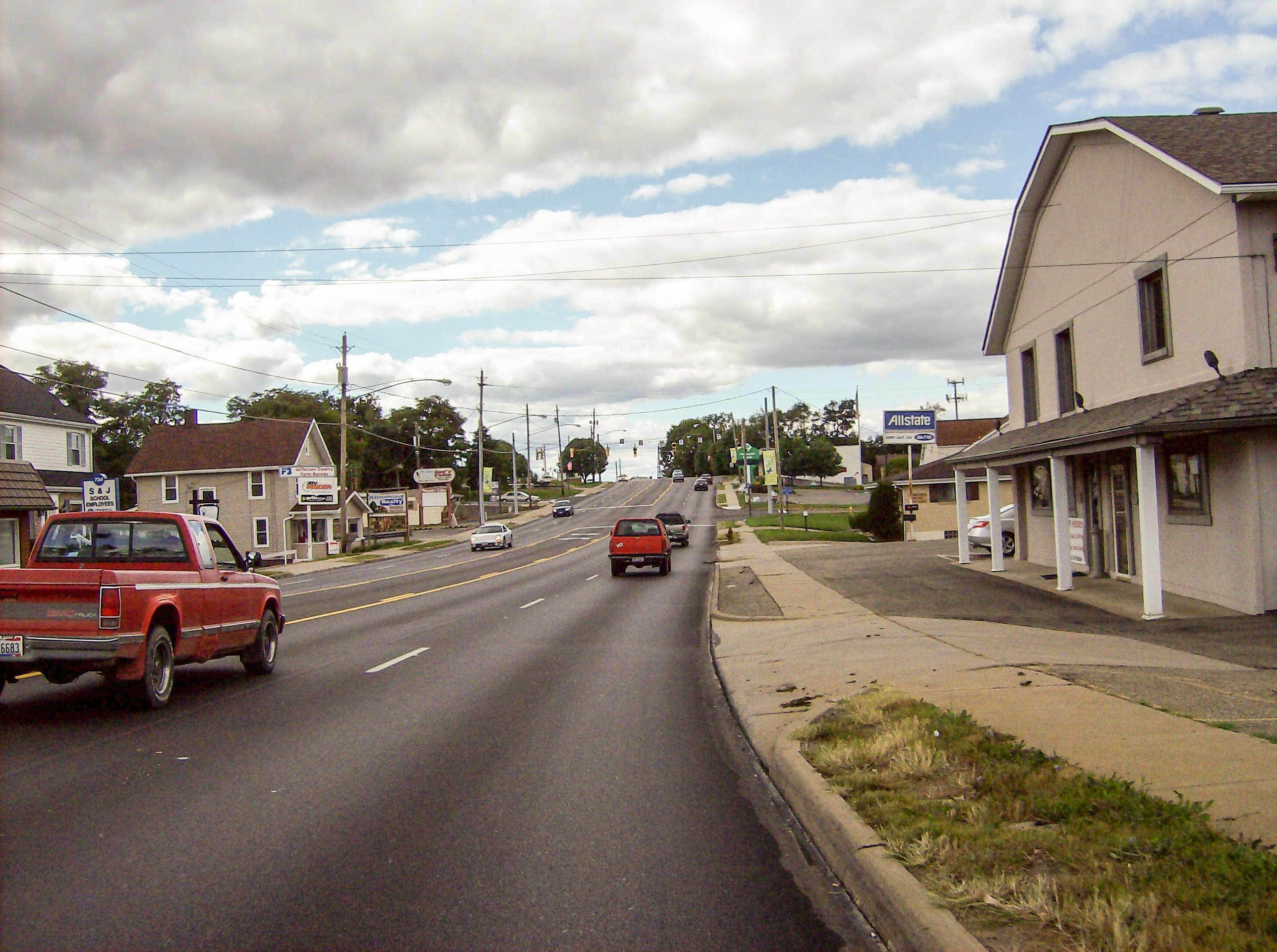
- Ohio State Route 43
- Interactive map of Wintersville, Ohio
- Location within Ohio Location within the United States
- Coordinates: 40°22′30″N 80°42′23″W
- Country: United States
- State: Ohio
- County: Jefferson
- Townships: Cross Creek, Island Creek

Government
  - Mayor: Mike Petrella

Area
  - Total: 3.12 sq mi (8.09 km^{2})
  - Land: 3.12 sq mi (8.09 km^{2})
  - Water: 0 sq mi (0.00 km^{2})
- Elevation: 1,145 ft (349 m)

Population (2020)
  - Total: 3,765
  - Density: 1,205.0/sq mi (465.25/km^{2})
- Time zone: UTC-5 (Eastern (EST))
  - Summer (DST): UTC-4 (EDT)
- ZIP codes: 43952, 43953
- Area code: 740
- FIPS code: 39-86184
- GNIS feature ID: 2399724
- Website: www.wintersvilleoh.us

Wintersville is a village in central Jefferson County, Ohio, United States. The population was 3,609 as of the 2020 census. It is part of the Weirton–Steubenville metropolitan area. The village is suburban and is governed by a mayor and council elected by non-partisan ballot.

== History ==
The first settlement at Wintersville was made in 1831. The village was named for its founder, John Winters. A post office was established at Wintersville in 1831, and remained in operation until 1901.

Confederate general John Hunt Morgan traveled through Wintersville during the 1863 Morgan's Raid on his way to defeat at the Battle of Salineville in the American Civil War.

== Geography ==
According to the United States Census Bureau, the village has a total area of 3.12 square miles (8.08 km^{2}), all land.

In addition to a direct highway system, Wintersville is strategically located 30 miles from the Pittsburgh International Airport, 20 miles from the Wheeling-Ohio County Airport, and abuts the Jefferson County Airport on its south corporate line. River and rail transportation are available along the Ohio River.

== Demographics ==
Historical population
Census	Pop.	Note	%±
1850	121		—
1860	127		5.0%
1870	113		−11.0%
1950	1,950		—
1960	3,597		84.5%
1970	4,921		36.8%
1980	4,724		−4.0%
1990	4,102		−13.2%
2000	4,067		−0.9%
2010	3,924		−3.5%
2020	3,765		−4.1%
U.S. Decennial Census

=== 2020 census ===
As of the 2020 census, Wintersville had a population of 3,765. The median age was 49.1 years. 17.7% of residents were under the age of 18 and 27.7% of residents were 65 years of age or older. For every 100 females there were 90.8 males, and for every 100 females age 18 and over there were 88.8 males age 18 and over.

94.8% of residents lived in urban areas, while 5.2% lived in rural areas.

There were 1,721 households in Wintersville, of which 21.9% had children under the age of 18 living in them. Of all households, 41.1% were married-couple households, 19.7% were households with a male householder and no spouse or partner present, and 32.5% were households with a female householder and no spouse or partner present. About 37.2% of all households were made up of individuals and 20.2% had someone living alone who was 65 years of age or older.

There were 1,841 housing units, of which 6.5% were vacant. The homeowner vacancy rate was 1.5% and the rental vacancy rate was 5.7%.

Racial composition as of the 2020 census
Race	Number	Percent
White	3,302	87.7%
Black or African American	223	5.9%
American Indian and Alaska Native	5	0.1%
Asian	29	0.8%
Native Hawaiian and Other Pacific Islander	0	0.0%
Some other race	16	0.4%
Two or more races	190	5.0%
Hispanic or Latino (of any race)	68	1.8%

=== 2010 census ===
As of the census of 2010, there were 3,924 people, 1,740 households, and 1,083 families living in the village. The population density was 1,257.7 inhabitants per square mile (485.6/km^{2}). There were 1,840 housing units at an average density of 589.7 per square mile (227.7/km^{2}). The racial makeup of the village was 91.4% White, 6.4% African American, 0.1% Native American, 0.8% Asian, 0.1% from other races, and 1.1% from two or more races. Hispanic or Latino of any race were 0.9% of the population.

There were 1,740 households, of which 23.6% had children under the age of 18 living with them, 47.1% were married couples living together, 10.7% had a female householder with no husband present, 4.4% had a male householder with no wife present, and 37.8% were non-families. 34.0% of all households were made up of individuals, and 18.4% had someone living alone who was 65 years of age or older. The average household size was 2.20 and the average family size was 2.79.

The median age in the village was 48.8 years. 17.8% of residents were under the age of 18; 6.7% were between the ages of 18 and 24; 20% were from 25 to 44; 30.6% were from 45 to 64; and 24.9% were 65 years of age or older. The gender makeup of the village was 46.8% male and 53.2% female.

=== 2000 census ===
As of the census of 2000, there were 4,067 people, 1,743 households, and 1,188 families living in the village. The population density was 1,154.4 inhabitants per square mile (445.7/km^{2}). There were 1,802 housing units at an average density of 511.5 per square mile (197.5/km^{2}). The racial makeup of the village was 92.82% White, 6.02% African American, 0.02% Native American, 0.20% Asian, 0.02% from other races, and 0.91% from two or more races. Hispanic or Latino of any race were 0.57% of the population.

There were 1,743 households, out of which 23.2% had children under the age of 18 living with them, 54.9% were married couples living together, 9.6% had a female householder with no husband present, and 31.8% were non-families. 29.4% of all households were made up of individuals, and 14.6% had someone living alone who was 65 years of age or older. The average household size was 2.26 and the average family size was 2.78.

In the village, the population was spread out, with 18.4% under the age of 18, 6.6% from 18 to 24, 25.4% from 25 to 44, 28.4% from 45 to 64, and 21.2% who were 65 years of age or older. The median age was 45 years. For every 100 females there were 93.4 males. For every 100 females age 18 and over, there were 89.5 males.

The median income for a household in the village was $35,330, and the median income for a family was $46,190. Males had a median income of $38,125 versus $20,969 for females. The per capita income for the village was $18,941. About 3.7% of families and 6.9% of the population were below the poverty line, including 7.1% of those under age 18 and 3.6% of those age 65 or over.

== Education ==
Public education in the village of Wintersville is provided by the Indian Creek Local School District, which includes two elementary schools, one middle school and Indian Creek High School.
