= Buckeye Trail High School =

Location
- 65555 Wintergreen Road; Lore City, (Guernsey County), Ohio 43755; United States; 40°2′49″N 81°26′45″W

Information
- Type: Public high school
- School district: East Guernsey Local School District
- Superintendent: Chase Rosser
- Principal: Duane A. Poland
- Teaching staff: 20.71 (FTE)
- Grades: 9-12
- Student to teacher ratio: 13.81
- Colors: Royal blue and white
- Athletics conference: Ohio Valley Athletic Conference Inter Valley Conference
- Team name: Warriors
- Rival: Barnesville High School
- Athletic Director: Aaron Bates
- Website: School Website

Buckeye Trail High School is a public high school in Lore City, Ohio, United States. It is the only high school in the East Guernsey Local School District. Their mascot is a Warrior, and the school colors are blue and white. They are members of the Ohio Valley Athletic Conference. They used to be members of the Pioneer Valley Conference, but in a controversial move that sparked community outrage, became members of the Inter Valley Conference (IVC) in 2016.

== OHSAA State Championships ==
- Girls Basketball - 1979
- Girls Volleyball - 1989, 1994.

== Notable Student Achievements ==
The 2013-2014 senior Physics class conducted a research and community outreach project for Samsung's "Solve For Tomorrow" contest. The class of sixteen worked with their teacher and other area educators to investigate the impact of recent drastic increases in hydraulic fracturing on local water quality, and presented their findings at a community forum held at the high school; experts on various aspects of the industry also presented to the community members in attendance. Samsung awarded the school a $20,000 technology grant for that year's best project in the state of Ohio.
