= Shenandoah High School (Ohio) =

Location
- 49346 Seneca Lake Rd; Sarahsville, Ohio 43779; United States; 39.808684°N 81.448454°W

Information
- Established: 1963
- School district: Noble Local School District
- Superintendent: Justin Denius
- CEEB code: 364583
- Principal: Trevor Tom
- Teaching staff: 19.43 (FTE)
- Grades: 9-12
- Enrollment: 217 (2018–19)
- Student to teacher ratio: 11.17
- Colors: Green & White
- Athletics: OHSAA AA
- Athletics conference: Ohio Valley Athletic Conference Mid-Ohio Valley League
- Team name: Zeps
- Publication: Noble Local News
- Website: https://shs.gozeps.org/

Shenandoah High School is a public high school near Sarahsville, Ohio. It is the only high school in the Noble Local School District. Their nickname is the Zeps.

== History ==
The school's construction was the result of the consolidation of area school districts. Shenandoah High School opened in September 1963 with 390 students. Ohio Congressman Robert T. Secrest gave the main address at the school's official dedication in November.

The school was named for the USS Shenandoah (ZR-1), a rigid airship which crashed in Noble County on September 2, 1925, which is also the source of their "Zeps" nickname.

Renovations to the school that added HVAC were completed in 2018.

== Extracurricular activities ==
Their chief sports rivals are the Caldwell Redskins.
