= Shadyside, Ohio =

- Village
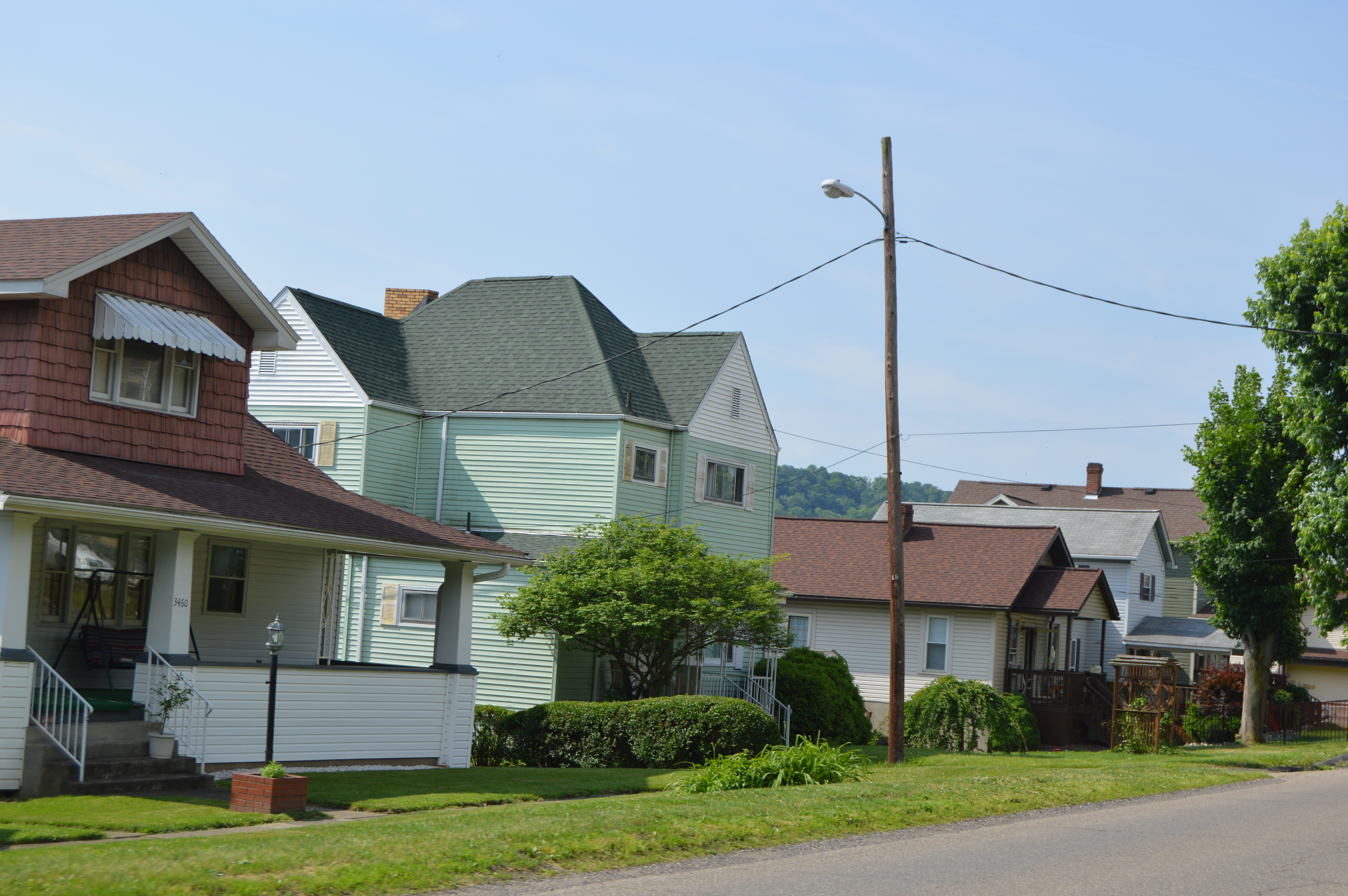
- Houses on the main street

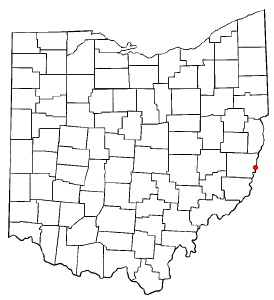
- Location of Shadyside, Ohio

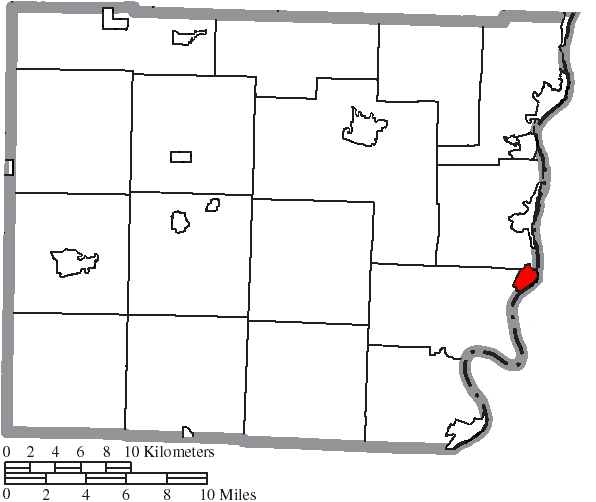
- Location of Shadyside in Belmont County
- Coordinates: 39°58′22″N 80°44′54″W
- Country: United States
- State: Ohio
- County: Belmont
- Townships: Mead, Pultney

Government
  - Mayor: Mike Meintel

Area
  - Total: 1.03 sq mi (2.67 km^{2})
  - Land: 1.01 sq mi (2.62 km^{2})
  - Water: 0.019 sq mi (0.05 km^{2})
- Elevation: 699 ft (213 m)

Population (2020)
  - Total: 3,454
  - Density: 3,418.9/sq mi (1,320.06/km^{2})
- Time zone: UTC-5 (Eastern (EST))
  - Summer (DST): UTC-4 (EDT)
- ZIP code: 43947
- Area code: 740
- FIPS code: 39-71640
- GNIS feature ID: 2399790

Shadyside is a village in eastern Belmont County, Ohio, United States, along the Ohio River. The population was 3,454 at the 2020 census. It is part of the Wheeling metropolitan area.

== History ==
Shadyside had its start in 1879 when the railroad was extended to that point. The town site was platted in 1901. The village was named after a local tree-lined farm.

On the evening of June 14, 1990, three to six inches (76 mm) of rain fell in less than two hours, in the ridges to the west, creating a flash flood in the Shadyside area which caused twenty-six fatalities and destroyed or damaged many buildings. Flooding occurred along Pipe Creek, Wegee Creek, and Cumberland Run. Witnesses reported seeing a "wall of water" ten to thirty feet high moving downstream. Communications issues experienced during the response to the flood, because the county's fire departments operated on two different frequencies, contributed to the state's decision to build an interoperable statewide radio system.

South of Shadyside was the location of the R.E. Burger Power Station. The coal fired power plant generated electricity from 1944 to 2011.

== Geography ==
According to the United States Census Bureau, the village has a total area of 1.03 square miles (2.67 km^{2}), of which 1.01 square miles (2.62 km^{2}) is land and 0.02 square miles (0.05 km^{2}) is water.

== Demographics ==
Historical population
Census	Pop.	Note	%±
1920	3,084		—
1930	4,098		32.9%
1940	4,048		−1.2%
1950	4,433		9.5%
1960	5,028		13.4%
1970	5,070		0.8%
1980	4,315		−14.9%
1990	3,934		−8.8%
2000	3,675		−6.6%
2010	3,785		3.0%
2020	3,454		−8.7%
U.S. Decennial Census

=== 2020 census ===
As of the 2020 census, Shadyside had a population of 3,454. The median age was 48.3 years. 17.2% of residents were under the age of 18 and 26.0% of residents were 65 years of age or older. For every 100 females there were 92.3 males, and for every 100 females age 18 and over there were 89.8 males age 18 and over.

98.3% of residents lived in urban areas, while 1.7% lived in rural areas.

There were 1,601 households in Shadyside, of which 22.2% had children under the age of 18 living in them. Of all households, 40.7% were married-couple households, 22.5% were households with a male householder and no spouse or partner present, and 29.5% were households with a female householder and no spouse or partner present. About 37.1% of all households were made up of individuals and 18.1% had someone living alone who was 65 years of age or older.

There were 1,846 housing units, of which 13.3% were vacant. The homeowner vacancy rate was 1.8% and the rental vacancy rate was 18.6%.

Racial composition as of the 2020 census
Race	Number	Percent
White	3,297	95.5%
Black or African American	18	0.5%
American Indian and Alaska Native	0	0.0%
Asian	17	0.5%
Native Hawaiian and Other Pacific Islander	0	0.0%
Some other race	27	0.8%
Two or more races	95	2.8%
Hispanic or Latino (of any race)	52	1.5%

=== 2010 census ===
As of the census of 2010, there were 3,785 people, 1,717 households, and 1,045 families living in the village. The population density was 3,747.5 inhabitants per square mile (1,446.9/km^{2}). There were 1,863 housing units at an average density of 1,844.6 per square mile (712.2/km^{2}). The racial makeup of the village was 99.0% White, 0.2% African American, 0.1% Native American, 0.2% Asian, and 0.5% from two or more races. Hispanic or Latino of any race were 0.5% of the population.

There were 1,717 households, of which 24.1% had children under the age of 18 living with them, 45.2% were married couples living together, 11.5% had a female householder with no husband present, 4.1% had a male householder with no wife present, and 39.1% were non-families. 34.2% of all households were made up of individuals, and 18.5% had someone living alone who was 65 years of age or older. The average household size was 2.15 and the average family size was 2.75.

The median age in the village was 47.9 years. 17.5% of residents were under the age of 18; 7.3% were between the ages of 18 and 24; 21.5% were from 25 to 44; 30.2% were from 45 to 64; and 23.5% were 65 years of age or older. The gender makeup of the village was 45.9% male and 54.1% female.

=== 2000 census ===
As of the census of 2000, there were 3,675 people, 1,721 households, and 1,044 families living in the village. The population density was 3,844.6 inhabitants per square mile (1,484.4/km^{2}). There were 1,856 housing units at an average density of 1,941.6 per square mile (749.7/km^{2}). The racial makeup of the village was 99.24% White, 0.11% African American, 0.08% Native American, 0.05% Asian, 0.05% from other races, and 0.46% from two or more races. Hispanic or Latino of any race were 0.22% of the population.

There were 1,721 households, out of which 23.3% had children under the age of 18 living with them, 49.3% were married couples living together, 9.1% had a female householder with no husband present, and 39.3% were non-families. 36.7% of all households were made up of individuals, and 23.3% had someone living alone who was 65 years of age or older. The average household size was 2.14 and the average family size was 2.79.

In the village, the population was spread out, with 19.6% under the age of 18, 5.3% from 18 to 24, 24.5% from 25 to 44, 24.2% from 45 to 64, and 26.3% who were 65 years of age or older. The median age was 45 years. For every 100 females, there were 86.3 males. For every 100 females age 18 and over, there were 80.8 males.

The median income for a household in the village was $28,989, and the median income for a family was $39,364. Males had a median income of $35,703 versus $18,973 for females. The per capita income for the village was $16,636. About 5.9% of families and 9.2% of the population were below the poverty line, including 6.6% of those under age 18 and 9.0% of those age 65 or over.

== Education ==
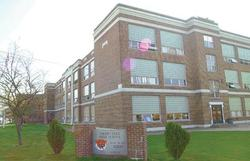
Shadyside High School

Shadyside is home to three schools: Shadyside High School, Leona Avenue Middle School and Jefferson Elementary School. There are 853 students and 43 teachers. The student to teacher ratio is 19.9:1. The school system is 99.9% white and has a 51% (female) to 48% (male) ratio for gender. The high school is located at 3890 Lincoln Avenue, Shadyside, Ohio 43947. The middle school is located at 3795 Leona Avenue, Shadyside, Ohio 43947. The elementary school is located at 4895 Jefferson Avenue, Shadyside, Ohio 43947.

The school system has a strong alumni association. It provides services to the community along with scholarships, a fund to help develop academic programs within the school and reunions. As of December 31, 2001, there were 699 members in the association.

Shadyside has a public library, a branch of the Belmont County District Library.

== Notable people ==
- Don Fleming, NFL defensive back
- Brad Lewis, NCAA quarterback

== See also ==
- List of cities and towns along the Ohio River
