= Caldwell High School (Caldwell, Ohio) =

Coordinates: 39.751°N 81.518°W

Location
- 516 Fairground St. Caldwell, Ohio 43724; United States

Information
- School district: Caldwell Exempted Village School District
- Principal: Tiffany Speck
- Teaching staff: 18.25 (FTE)
- Grades: 9-12
- Enrollment: 231 (2023–2024)
- Student to teacher ratio: 12.66
- Colors: Red & White
- Athletics: OHSAA
- Athletics conference: OVAC AA
- Team name: Redskins
- Website: Caldwell EVSD

Caldwell High School is a public high school in Caldwell, Ohio. It is the only high school in the Caldwell Exempted Village School District. Their nickname is the Redskins. They are members of the Ohio Valley Athletic Conference. Their chief sports rivals are the Shenandoah Zeps, the only other high school in the county.

== Ohio High School Athletic Association State Championships ==
- Boys Cross Country – 1973, 1985, 1986, 1987, 1988, 1989, 1990, 1991, 1992

== See also ==
- Native American mascot controversy
- Sports teams named Redskins
