= Shadyside High School (Ohio) =

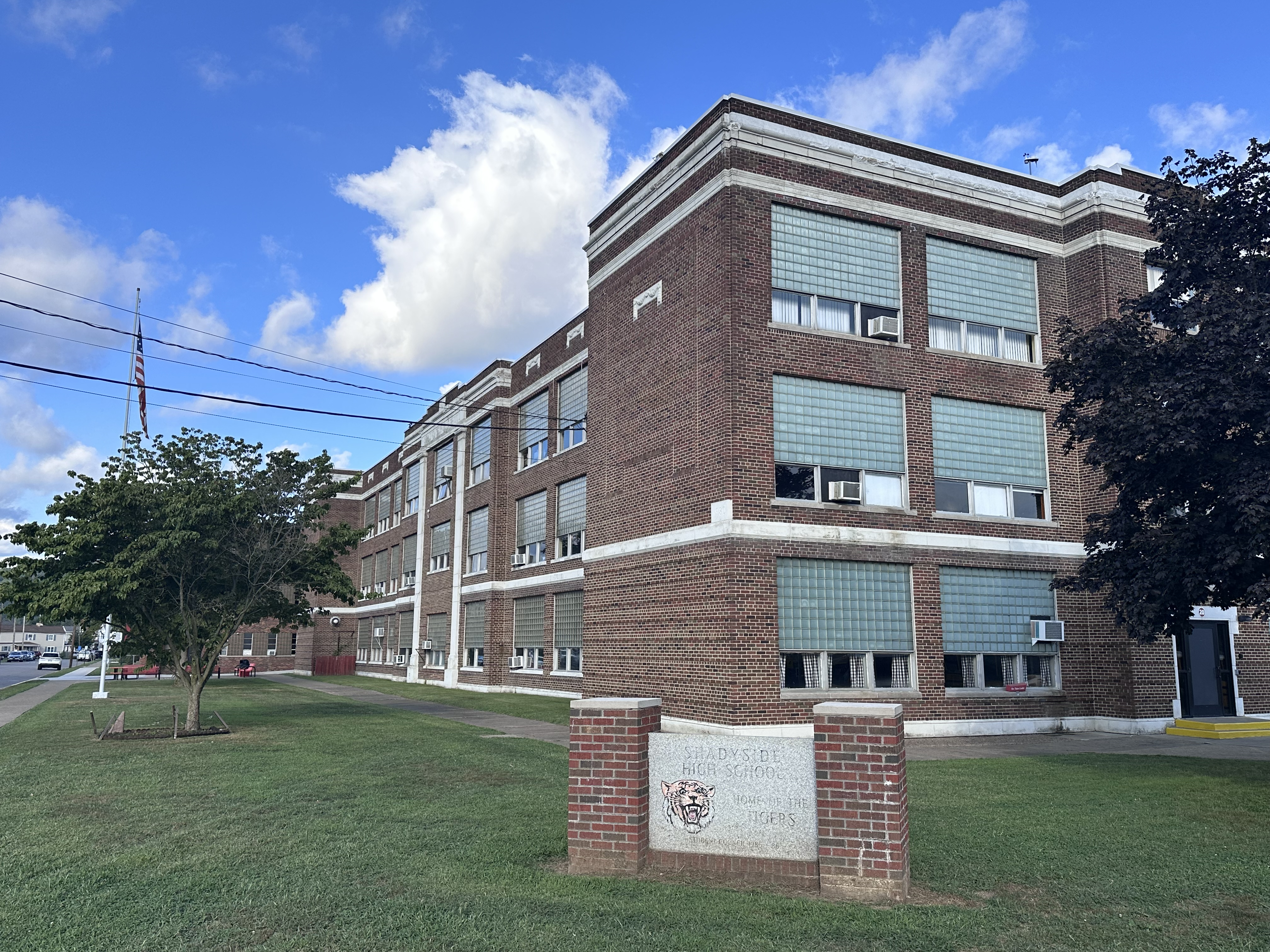

Location
- 3890 Lincoln Avenue; Shadyside, Ohio 43947; United States

Information
- Type: Public high school
- School district: Shadyside Local School District
- Superintendent: John M. Haswell
- CEEB code: 364635
- Principal: John Poilek
- Teaching staff: 18.20 (FTE)
- Grades: 7-12
- Student to teacher ratio: 16.26
- Campus type: Small Suburb
- Colors: Orange and Black
- Athletics conference: Ohio Valley Athletic Conference
- Mascot: Tiger
- Team name: Tigers
- Website: www.shadysideschools.com/page/high-school-home

Shadyside High School is a public high school in Shadyside, Ohio, United States. It is the only high school in the Shadyside Local School District. Athletic teams compete as the Shadyside Tigers in the Ohio High School Athletic Association as a member of the Ohio Valley Athletic Conference.

== OHSAA State Championships ==
- Boys Track and Field – 1976
- Girls Softball – 2015
