= Wheeling Park High School =

Coordinates: 40°4′7.4″N 80°39′11.9″W

Location
- 1976 Park View Road; Wheeling, West Virginia 26003; United States

Information
- Type: Public, Coeducational high school
- Motto: Experience the Park
- Established: 1976
- School district: Ohio County School District
- Superintendent: Kimberly S. Miller
- Principal: Meredith Dailer
- Faculty: 105.83 (on an FTE basis)
- Grades: 9-12
- Student to teacher ratio: 13.48
- Campus type: Rural / Fringe-Rural
- Colors: Red, White, and Blue
- Athletics: Football, soccer, lacrosse, hockey, tennis, volleyball, track, cross country, golf, basketball, cheering, dance, wrestling, swimming, baseball, and softball.
- Athletics conference: Ohio Valley Athletic Conference
- Nickname: Palace on the Hill
- Team name: Patriots
- Rival: John Marshall High School (West Virginia)
- Publication: WPHP 91.9 FM; WPHP-TV, The Patriot Connection
- Newspaper: Park Press
- Website: www.wphs.ohio.k12.wv.us

Wheeling Park High School is a public high school in Wheeling, West Virginia, United States. It is the only public high school in the Ohio County School District. Athletic teams compete as the Wheeling Park Patriots in the WVSSAC Class AAA, as well as the Ohio Valley Athletic Conference.

The school opened for the 1976-1977 academic year following the consolidation of Wheeling, Triadelphia, Warwood and West Liberty high schools.

== Education ==
=== Academic Performance ===
In Wheeling Park's 2017-2018 Balanced Scorecard report conducted by the West Virginia Department of Education, the school received positive marks for its graduation rate but received negative marks for its academic performance due to its failure to meet the State's standards for academic performance. For this period, Wheeling Park received the lowest possible grade, Does Not Meet Standard, for its academic performance in mathematics and a Partially Meets Standard grade for its academic performance in English language arts.

=== Advanced Placement ===
Wheeling Park offers 19 Advanced Placement courses: Biology, Calculus AB, Calculus BC, Environmental Science, English Language, English Literature, Geography, Physics B, Physics C, Political Science, U.S. History, World History, Statistics, Chemistry, Psychology, Music Theory, Spanish, Seminar, and Research.

Wheeling Park students may also take courses for college credit through West Liberty University and West Virginia Northern Community College.

=== Career and Technical ===
The Career and Technical Department houses several labs for engineering, graphic design, and computer electronics; including a 3D printer. This department also has the auto-mechanics shop, collision repair, welding, machine tool technology, building construction, and power equipment systems classes.

== Fine and Performing Arts ==
There are two theaters at Wheeling Park High school: the Phyllis A. Beneke Theatre and the JB Chambers Performing Arts Center. The music department has a piano lab and three rehearsal rooms.

Wheeling Park is home to bands, choral ensembles, orchestral groups, and bluegrass bands. Its concert band has achieved 36 consecutive "superior" ratings at Region 1 Band Festival + 9 academic achievement awards statewide. Wheeling Park's music department and many other Ohio County Schools' music departments perform at the JB Performing Arts Center, commonly referred to as the "PAC," a 12 million dollar investment from Ohio County Schools, seating 1200 in a gallery style theater, having opened in 2012.

Wheeling Park is also the home of the award-winning Wheeling Park High School Speech and Debate Team, which in 2024 won its 44th state championship in Morgantown, WV.

== Athletics ==
=== Sports ===
Boys: soccer, football, basketball, baseball, softball, golf, lacrosse, hockey, wrestling, cross country, track, and swimming.

Girls: soccer, football, basketball, softball, golf, lacrosse, hockey, wrestling, cross country, track, swimming, volleyball, cheering, and competitive dancing.

==== State Titles ====
Listed below are the state championships won by Wheeling Park High School.

- Football 2015
- Boys basketball 1980, 1995
- Girls basketball 1998, 1999, 2024
- Boys cross country 1986, 2007, 2008
- Girls Cross Country 1984
- Boys track 1978, 1979, 1988, 2007
- Girls track 1995
- Wrestling 1977, 1978, 1981, 1986, 1987, 2006, 2022
- Girls swim 2017
- Cheer 1989, 2014, 2015, 2016, 2019, 2020
- Golf 2002, 2010, 2011, 2013, 2014, 2020, 2022
- Boys Tennis 2006

=== Facilities ===
The Wheeling Island Stadium, located on Wheeling Island, is the Patriots home field, while also serving as a location for various Wheeling sports teams to play. Wheeling Park hosts the annual WVSSAC Super 6 Football Championship.

Three gymnasiums, a fitness center, a wrestling room, and indoor Olympic-sized pool make up the Physical Education department.

== Campus ==
The high school building houses physical education, special education, technical education, and regular education. The building is 860 feet long and 550 feet wide for a total of 473,000 square feet. There are three floors of masonry block insulation with brick veneer. Additional education wings added in 1984 on both ends of the building comprise 7750 square feet. There are four lighted tennis courts, an eight-lane track and adjoining baseball, softball, football and soccer fields which complete the entire 52-acre complex. The Media Center comprises the library, two computer labs, and the Maker Space, which has a 3D printer. The school also houses PC and Mac computer labs.

== Notable alumni ==
- Rob Garrison (1978), actor
- Amy Shuler Goodwin (1989), mayor of Charleston, West Virginia
- Joko Anwar (1995), director
- Travis Braden (2012), race-car driver
- Michael Grove (2014), MLB pitcher
