= St. Clairsville High School =

Public school in Ohio, US

Location
- 102 Woodrow Avenue; St. Clairsville, Ohio 43950; United States; 40°4′46″N 80°53′47″W

Information
- Type: Public, high school
- School district: St. Clairsville-Richland City School District
- Superintendent: Christina Laudermilt
- Principal: Justin Sleutz
- Teaching staff: 22.84 (FTE)
- Grades: 9–12
- Gender: Male and Female
- Enrollment: 522 (2023-2024)
- Student to teacher ratio: 22.85
- Colors: Scarlet and Grey
- Athletics conference: Buckeye 8 Athletic League; Ohio Valley Athletic Conference
- Team name: Red Devils
- Website: www.stcs.k12.oh.us

St. Clairsville High School is a public high school in St. Clairsville, Ohio, United States. It currently houses grades 9 through 12. Their nickname is the Red Devils, and they compete in the Ohio High School Athletic Association as a member of the Buckeye 8 Athletic League as well as the Ohio Valley Athletic Conference.

== Athletics ==
=== State championships ===
- Boys track and field - 2016

== Notable alumni ==
- Jim Bradshaw, former professional football player in the National Football League (NFL)
- Jim Kerr, former professional football player in the National Football League (NFL))
- Tim Spencer, former professional football player in the National Football League (NFL)
