= Vincent, Ohio =

Census-designated place in Ohio, US

- CDP
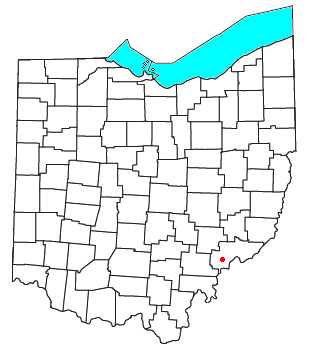
- Location of Vincent, Ohio
- Coordinates: 39°22′34″N 81°40′11″W
- Country: United States
- State: Ohio
- County: Washington
- Township: Barlow
- Elevation: 764 ft (233 m)

Population (2020)
  - Total: 329
- Time zone: UTC-5 (Eastern (EST))
  - Summer (DST): UTC-4 (EDT)
- ZIP code: 45784
- GNIS feature ID: 2628983

Vincent is a census-designated place in southern Barlow Township, Washington County, Ohio, United States. It lies along State Route 339 near Tupper Creek, a subsidiary of the Little Hocking River, which in turn meets the Ohio River at Little Hocking to the south. The population was 329 at the 2020 census.

== History ==
Vincent had its start when the Marietta & Cincinnati Railroad was extended to that point. The community was founded as Vincents Station in 1853 by Henry Earle Vincent, and named for him. A post office called Vincent has been in operation since 1857.

== Education ==
It is in the Warren Local School District.

- Warren High School and Warren Middle School serve local students.
