= Warren Local High School (Vincent, Ohio) =

Warren High School

Location
- 130 Warrior Drive; Vincent, Ohio 45784; United States
- Coordinates: 39°23′16″N 81°39′50″W

Information
- Type: Public high school
- Established: 1961
- Status: Open
- School district: Warren Local School District
- Superintendent: Kyle Newton
- CEEB code: 365265
- Principal: Kyle Scott and Chad Porter
- Teaching staff: 34.75 (FTE)
- Grades: 9-12
- Student to teacher ratio: 16.55
- Campus type: Distant Rural
- Colors: Blue and White
- Athletics conference: Tri-Valley Conference (Ohio)
- Mascot: pegasus
- Team name: Warriors
- Athletic Director: Steve Harold
- Website: whs.warrenlocal.org

Warren High School is a public high school in Vincent, Ohio, United States. It is the only secondary school in the Warren Local School District. Athletic teams compete as the Warren Warriors in the Ohio High School Athletic Association as a member of the Tri-Valley Conference (Ohio). It is one of the only high schools left in the country with a dedicated hand bells program.
