= Trinity Christian School (Morgantown, West Virginia) =

Coordinates: 39°37′15.8″N 79°54′58.3″W

- Morgantown, West Virginia; USA

Information
- Type: Private
- Motto: 'Educating for Life, Inspiring Excellence, Honoring God'
- Established: 2005
- Colors: Cardinal Red and Vegas Gold
- Mascot: Warrior
- Website: www.tcswv.org

Trinity Christian School is a private, interdenominational Christian school in Morgantown, West Virginia serving preschool through grade 12. Originally founded as Trinity High School in 1997, the school served grades seven through nine, adding a grade each subsequent year. The first class graduated in 2001. Trinity joined with Alliance Christian (elementary) School in 2005 and became Trinity Christian School. Its campus has science labs, classroom Promethean boards, and sports facilities.

During the mid-1990s, parents of students of the former Alliance Christian School were concerned that there no longer remained an option for Christian education beyond middle school in the Morgantown area. The Trinity High School opened for the 1997–1998 school year, taking the 7th and 8th grades from ACS and also allowing students entering 9th grade. Adding one grade each year to retain students, Trinity graduated its first class in 2001.

The school has a girls' basketball team, the Warriors.
