= Frontier High School (New Matamoras, Ohio) =

Location
- 44870 Ohio Route 7 New Matamoras, Ohio 45767; United States; 39°26′52″N 81°08′37″W

Information
- Type: (Ohio) public, rural, high school
- Opened: 1968
- School district: Frontier Local School District
- Principal: Roger Kirkpatrick Athletic Director
- Head of school: Bruce Kidder, Superintendent
- Teaching staff: 19.34 (FTE)
- Grades: 9-12
- Enrollment: 218 (2024-2025)
- Student to teacher ratio: 11.27
- Colors: Columbia blue & Vegas gold
- Athletics: baseball, boys' and girls' basketball, football, fast pitch softball, golf and girls' volleyball
- Athletics conference: Pioneer Valley Conference
- Mascot: Cougars
- Rival: Hannibal River Pilots
- Website: District Website

Frontier High School is a public high school in New Matamoras, Ohio, United States. It is the only high school in the Frontier Local School district. It is located along the Ohio River just off of Route 7 between New Matamoras and Newport Ohio. Their colors are Columbia blue and vegas gold, and are known as the Cougars. They are members of the Pioneer Valley Conference and the Ohio Valley Athletic Conference. Frontier was formed in 1968 with the consolidation of Bloomfield, Matamoras, Newport and Lawrence High Schools.
