= Barnesville High School =

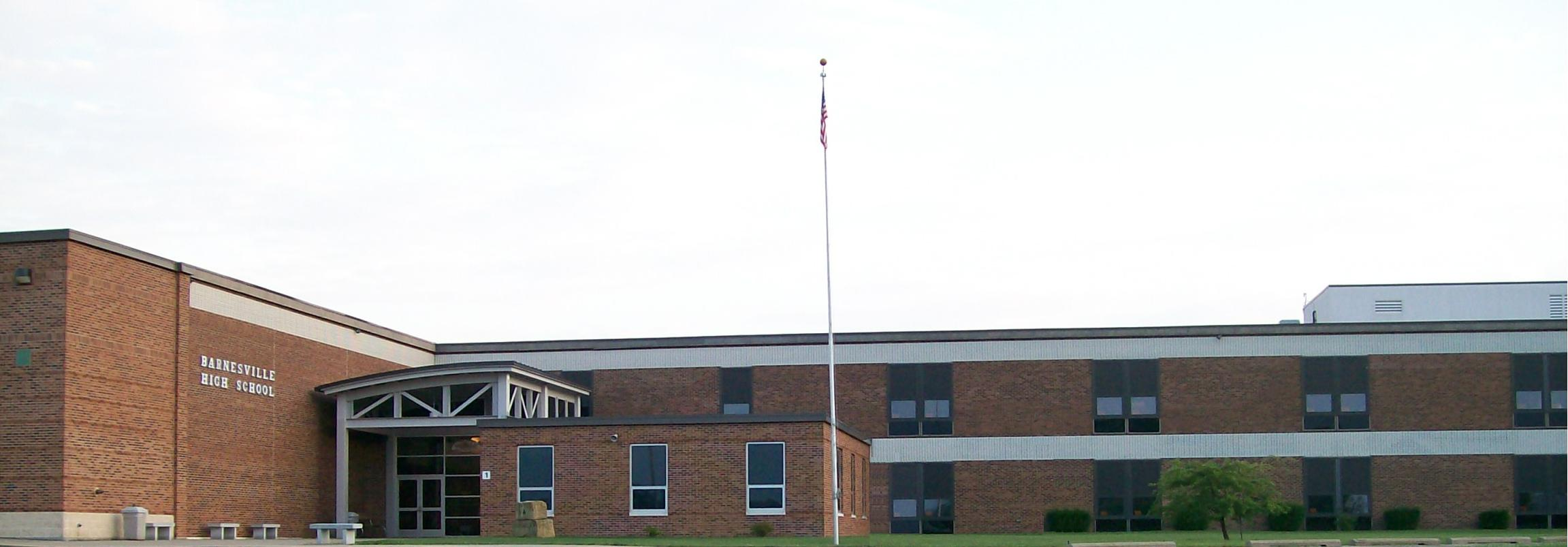

Location
- 910 Shamrock Drive; Barnesville, Ohio 43713; United States
- Coordinates: 39°59′14″N 81°9′29″W

Information
- Type: Public high school
- Established: 1874
- School district: Barnesville Exempted Village School District
- Superintendent: Micah Fuchs
- CEEB code: 360312
- Principal: Ron Clark
- Teaching staff: 20.58 (FTE)
- Grades: 9–12
- Student to teacher ratio: 18.71
- Campus type: Distant Town
- Colors: Kelly Green, White, and Red
- Fight song: Across the Field
- Athletics conference: Ohio Valley Athletic Conference
- Nickname: The "Rocks"
- Team name: Shamrocks
- Rival: Union Local High School
- Yearbook: The Senrab
- Website: www.barnesville.k12.oh.us/291089_2

Barnesville High School is a public high school in Barnesville, Ohio. It is the only high school in the Barnesville Exempted Village School District. Athletic teams compete as the Barnesville Shamrocks in the Ohio High School Athletic Association as a member of the Ohio Valley Athletic Conference.

== History ==
The high school was first opened in 1874 in downtown Barnesville, and the first class graduated in 1877. The school district began to feel growing pains in the 1940s and a measure was passed to build a new high school. A site was selected on the east end of Barnesville and groundbreaking commenced in the 1960s. The building later saw renovations in the early 2000s due to the growing student body. The work included an expanded gymnasium, an administration wing, enlarged art room and an industrial arts room, as well as some technological and decorative upgrades.

== Athletics ==
The following is an alphabetical list of sports offered by the high school.

- Baseball
- Basketball
- Cross Country
- Football
- Golf
- Softball
- Swimming
- Track and Field
- Volleyball
- Wrestling

=== OHSAA State Championships ===
- Boys Track and Field – 1978
- Boys Wrestling – 1984

Individual State Championship- 2023, Reese Stephen. (150 LB OHSAA D3 Champion)

- Girls Cross Country – 1997

== Extracurriculars ==
- Band
- Cheerleading
- National Honor Society
- Key Club
- Student Athletic Association
- Varsity B
- FOCA
- FEA
- FFA
- Art Club
- Senrab
