= East Central Ohio ESC =

School district in Ohio

The East Central Ohio Educational Service Center (ECOESC) provides services to 22 school districts within its service region. The ECOESC service region consists of Tuscarawas (567.58 sq mi), Carroll (394.67 sq mi), Harrison (403.53 sq mi) and Belmont (537.35 sq mi) Counties. This is over 1,900 square miles, making the ECOESC service regions one of the largest in the state. The ESC serves eight local school districts, four exempted village school districts, six city school districts, two vocational career centers, and two Board of DDs serving 28,085 students and 2,054 teachers across its service area.

The Ohio General Assembly created educational service centers in 1914 as county boards of education. State law changed boards of education to educational service centers in 1995.

The East Central Ohio ESC is directed by a governing board elected by the voters of the eight local school districts served by the ESC. Since educational service centers have no legal taxing or bonding authority, they must depend on revenues from member districts, from the state as prescribed in law, through contracted services to districts, and from competition for grants and state funding. State funding to ESCs consists of two major categories: unit funding for gifted and preschool handicapped units and a per pupil allocation.
