= McMahon Creek (Ohio) =

Creek in Belmont County, Ohio

McMahon Creek is a 28.1 mile (45.22 km) long creek, draining 91 square miles of Belmont County, Ohio. The creek originates in central Union Township, flows southeast into Goshen Township, then flows east through Smith Township, Richland Township and Pultney Township discharging into the Ohio River. November 2, 1904, McMahon was officially named by the United States Geological Survey.

== History ==
In 1806 John Warnock erected the first a sawmill on McMahon Creek.

About 1818 McMahon creek flooded resulting in the Hardesty family passing, for which the event became known as the Hardesty Flood. John Hardesty, his wife and five children lived near the banks of the stream, following a flash flood water rose above his house eventually sweeping it down stream. John and his wife were found a short distance from the original location of the house. Two of the children remains were found, while the remaining three were never found.

About 1828 the first coal mine opened on the creek by Joesph Ryan, for Captain Fink.

In 1853 John Workman built the first steam engine on the south side of McMahon creek. It was the first steam engine of the area and operated as a sawmill within Bellaire.

The Flood of 1888 washed away houses, bridges, and fences along the creek. A wall of water surrounded a passenger train, forcing it to a stop. The resulting damages were estimated at $200,000

In 1990, following extensive storms the creek and surrounding streams flooded, causing 26 fatalities and widespread property damage.

== Additional names ==
- Big McMahon Creek
- M'Mahons Creek
- MacMahons Creek
- McMahans Creek
- McMahon's Creek
- McMahons Creek
- McManns Creek
- McMechens Creek

== Course ==
McMahon Creek rises near Morristown, Ohio, and begins flowing southeast towards Belmont, Ohio. Then turning east into Smith, Township where it joins Willimas Creek, in Loomis, Ohio, then continuing east passing Lamira, Ohio, Warnock, Ohio, and Whitney, Ohio. Entering south Richland, Township, flowing south of Glencoe, Ohio where it joins Willimas Creek, and continues to Stewartsville, Ohio where it enters Pultney Township, and flows south of Neffs, Ohio joining Little McMahon Creek. Subsequently, flows south of Saint Joe, Ohio, McClainville, Ohio, and eventually enters the Ohio River south of Bellaire, Ohio. McMahon Creek drops 610 feet of elevation from the source to the mouth, with a 21.7 (ft/ml) average fall.

== Watershed ==
McMahon Creek is the principal stream in the McMahon watershed.

=== Tributaries ===
- Brooks Run
- Trough Run
- Rock Run
- Little McMahon Creek
  - Stillhouse Run
  - Kings Run
  - Aults Run
  - Chambers Run
- Willimas Creek
- Welsh Run
- Porterfield Run
- Hutchison run
- Neffs Run
  - Anderson Run
- Brush Run
- Robers Run
- Barkcamp Creek
