= Wheeling metropolitan area =

Coordinates: 40°04′00″N 80°43′00″W

Greater Wheeling
- Metropolitan Statistical Area
- Wheeling, WV–OH Metropolitan Statistical Area
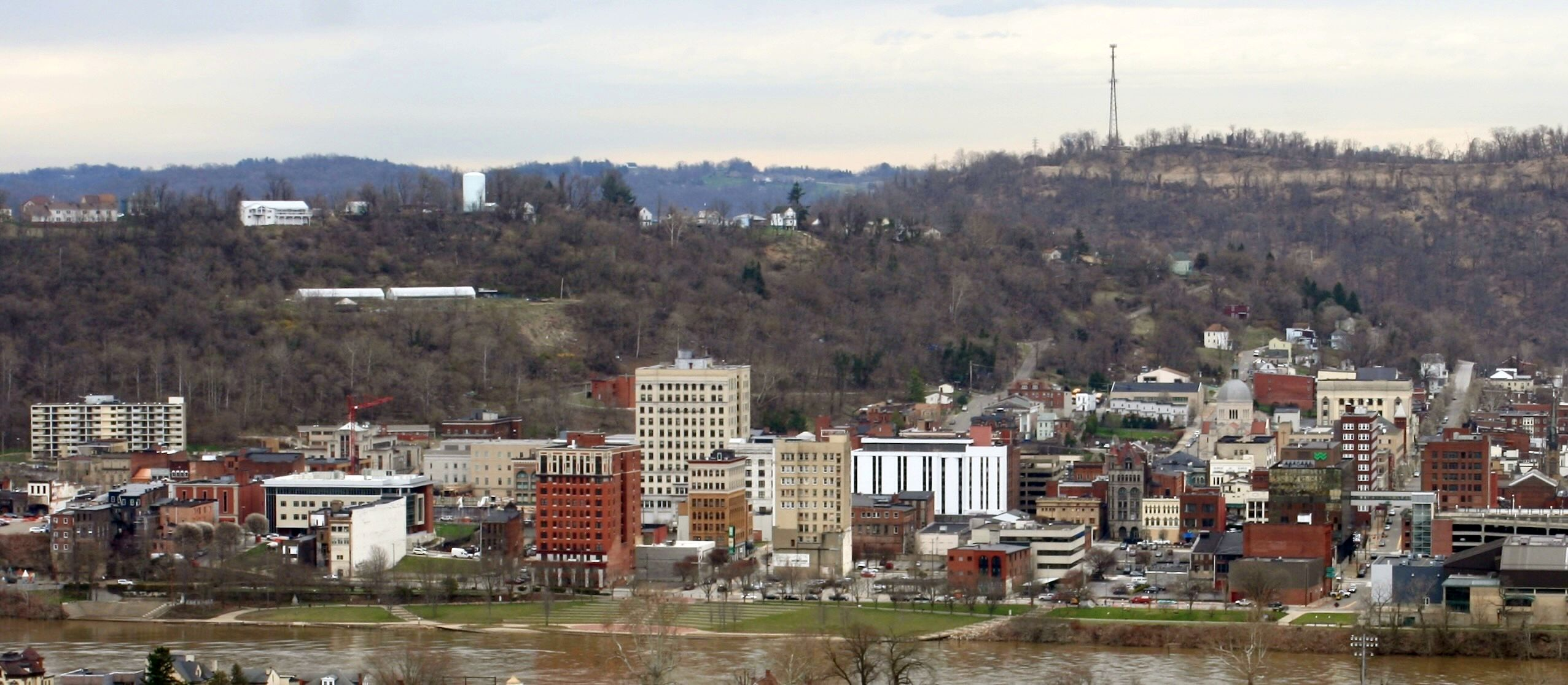
- Downtown Wheeling
Map of Wheeling, WV–OH MSA
City of Wheeling
Wheeling, WV–OH MSA
- Country: United States
- State: West Virginia; Ohio
- Largest city: Wheeling

Population
  - Total: 141,254
  - Rank: 290th in the U.S.
- Time zone: UTC−5 (EST)
  - Summer (DST): UTC−4 (EDT)

The Wheeling, WV–OH Metropolitan Statistical Area, as defined by the United States Census Bureau, is an area consisting of two counties in the Northern Panhandle of West Virginia and one in eastern Ohio, anchored by the city of Wheeling. As of the 2010 census, the MSA had a population of 147,950. This represents a decline of 3.4% from the 2000 census population of 153,172.

Greater Wheeling is generally considered part of the Pittsburgh Tri-State area, as the area is heavily influenced by Pittsburgh media and transportation (notably Pittsburgh International Airport), as well as some Ohio media and sports influence.

== Counties ==
- Marshall County, West Virginia
- Ohio County, West Virginia
- Belmont County, Ohio

== Communities ==
- Places with more than 25,000 inhabitants
  - Wheeling, West Virginia (Principal city)
- Places with 5,000 to 10,000 inhabitants
  - Martins Ferry, Ohio
  - Moundsville, West Virginia
  - St. Clairsville, Ohio

- Places with 1,000 to 5,000 inhabitants
  - Barnesville, Ohio
  - Bellaire, Ohio
  - Benwood, West Virginia
  - Bethesda, Ohio
  - Bethlehem, West Virginia
  - Bridgeport, Ohio
  - Glen Dale, West Virginia
  - McMechen, West Virginia
  - Powhatan Point, Ohio
  - Shadyside, Ohio
  - West Liberty, West Virginia

- Places with 500 to 1,000 inhabitants
  - Brookside, Ohio
  - Cameron, West Virginia
  - Flushing, Ohio
  - Neffs, Ohio (census-designated place)
  - Triadelphia, West Virginia
  - Yorkville, Ohio (partial
- Places with less than 500 inhabitants
  - Belmont, Ohio
  - Clearview, West Virginia
  - Fairview, Ohio
  - Holloway, Ohio
  - Morristown, Ohio
  - Valley Grove, West Virginia
  - Wilson, Ohio

- Unincorporated places
  - Alledonia, Ohio
  - Bannock, Ohio
  - Barton, Ohio
  - Betty Zane, West Virginia
  - Blaine, Ohio
  - Clinton, West Virginia
  - Colerain, Ohio
  - Eden, West Virginia
  - Elm Grove, West Virginia
  - Fairpoint, Ohio
  - Glencoe, Ohio
  - Greggsville, West Virginia
  - Jacobsburg, Ohio
  - Lafferty, Ohio
  - Lansing, Ohio
  - Maynard, Ohio
  - Mount Echo, West Virginia
  - Mount Olivet, West Virginia
  - Mozart, West Virginia
  - Natrium, West Virginia
  - Overbrook, West Virginia
  - Point Mills, West Virginia
  - Riverview, Ohio
  - Roneys Point, West Virginia
  - Sherrard, West Virginia
  - Warnock, Ohio
  - Warwood, West Virginia

- Townships (Belmont County, Ohio)
  - Colerain
  - Flushing
  - Goshen
  - Kirkwood
  - Mead
  - Pease
  - Pultney
  - Richland
  - Smith
  - Somerset
  - Union
  - Warren
  - Washington
  - Wayne
  - Wheeling
  - York

== Demographics ==
Historical population
Census	Pop.	Note	%±
1970	182,712		—
1980	185,566		1.6%
1990	159,301		−14.2%
2000	153,172		−3.8%
2010	147,950		−3.4%
2020	139,513		−5.7%
U.S. Decennial Census

As of the census of 2000, there were 153,172 people, 62,249 households, and 41,506 families residing within the MSA. The racial makeup of the MSA was 95.62% White, 2.87% African American, 0.12% Native American, 0.44% Asian, 0.02% Pacific Islander, 0.14% from other races, and 0.79% from two or more races. Hispanic or Latino of any race were 0.48% of the population.

The median income for a household in the MSA was $30,513, and the median income for a family was $39,284. Males had a median income of $31,388 versus $20,307 for females. The per capita income for the MSA was $16,942.

== See also ==
- West Virginia census statistical areas
- Ohio census statistical areas
