= Ohio State Route 149 =

State highway in eastern Ohio, US

State Route 149

Route information
- Maintained by ODOT
- Length: 36.09 mi (58.08 km)
- Existed: 1923–present

Major junctions
- South end: SR 7 in Bellaire
- I-70 in Morristown; US 40 in Morristown
- North end: SR 9 near New Athens

Location
- Country: United States
- State: Ohio
- Counties: Belmont, Harrison

Highway system
- Ohio State Highway System; Interstate; US; State; Scenic
← SR 148	→ SR 150

State Route 149 (SR 149) is an L-shaped state highway in eastern Ohio. Though the east–west leg of the route is longer than the north–south portion, the entire route is signed as north–south. The route starts at an interchange with SR 7 in Bellaire. The route heads west to Belmont where it turns north at an intersection with SR 147. After spending most of the time in Belmont County, SR 149's northern terminus is at SR 9 near New Athens, Harrison County.

== Route description ==
SR 149 begins at an interchange with SR 7 in Bellaire, just west of the Ohio River. The route heads west on 26th Street through Bellaire paralleling the McMahon Creek. Shortly after leaving Bellaire, the route passes through a large Cut as the creek bends to the south briefly. As the route heads west along the creek, SR 149 passes through several unincorporated communities including Neffs and Glencoe. In Warnock, SR 149 meets and shares a short concurrency (signed as a wrong-way concurrency) with SR 9. Continuing west, the route enters Belmont as Main Street and reaches SR 147 at Jefferson Street. The two routes continue west on Main Street, make a left turn onto Bridge Street, and make a right turn at Railroad Street before exiting the village. At an intersection just west of the village, SR 147 and SR 149 end their concurrency; SR 147 continues west towards Bethesda while SR 149 heads north from this point.

Prior to here, SR 149 traveled through a densely wooded valley, but now the route heads through more farmland with rolling terrain. As the route approaches Morristown, the route meets I-70 at Exit 208. From the interchange until the intersection with US 40, the route is surrounded by small businesses, fast foot restaurants, and the campuses of Union Local High School and Union Local Middle School. SR 149 shares a brief 0.06-mile-long (97 m) concurrency with US 40 on the edge of Morristown. After the westernmost intersection with US 40, SR 149 continues north again towards Flushing. In Flushing, SR 149 heads north on Morristown Street until it reaches SR 331 at High Street. The two routes head east on High Street through downtown Flushing and exit the village together. East of Flushing, SR 149 heads northeast for the last 2 miles (3.2 km) of the route through Belmont County. Upon entering Harrison County, SR 149 continues northeast until ending at an intersection with SR 9 just south of the New Athens village limits.

No part of SR 149 is included within the National Highway System. The route is lightly traveled; the busiest section of the road as measured by the Ohio Department of Transportation (ODOT) is within the SR 7 interchange in Bellaire with an AADT of 9,560.

== History ==
The highway now known as SR 149 between Morristown and New Athens has been a part of the State Highway System since 1912; the route was called SR 103 until 1922. By 1923, the Morristown-New Athens route was renumbered to SR 149. In 1930, the route was extended south to SR 147 just outside Belmont. In 1979, the route was extended from Belmont to Bellaire on essentially the route it runs today.

From 1979 to 2010, SR 149 traveled on a less-direct route through Bellaire. At the intersection of 26th Street and Belmont Street, SR 149 headed into downtown Bellaire and traveled on Belmont, Crescent, Guernsey, 32nd, and Hamilton Streets. In 2010, ODOT completed a 1.4-mile-long (2.3 km) relocation of SR 149 to move the state highway off of the local streets in Bellaire.

== Major junctions ==
County	Location	mi	km	Destinations	Notes
Belmont	Bellaire	0.00	0.00	SR 7 – Powhatan Point, Bridgeport	Interchange
Belmont	Smith Township	14.13	22.74	SR 9 north – St. Clairsville	Southern end of SR 9 concurrency
Belmont	Smith Township	14.26	22.95	SR 9 south – Armstrong Mills	Northern end of SR 9 concurrency
Belmont	Belmont	20.86	33.57	SR 147 east (Jefferson Street)	Southern end of SR 147 concurrency
Belmont	Goshen Township	21.37	34.39	SR 147 west – Bethesda, Barnesville	Northern end of SR 147 concurrency
Belmont	Union Township	23.79	38.29	I-70 – Wheeling, WV, Columbus	Exit 208 (I-70)
Belmont	Union Township	24.38	39.24	US 40 east (National Road) – St. Clairsville	Southern end of US 40 concurrency
Belmont	Union Township	24.44	39.33	US 40 west (National Road) – Morristown	Northern end of US 40 concurrency
Belmont	Flushing	31.25	50.29	SR 331 west (Depot Street) – Holloway	Southern end of SR 331 concurrency
Belmont	Goshen Township	32.95	53.03	SR 331 east – Bannock	Northern end of SR 331 concurrency
Harrison	Athens Township	36.09	58.08	SR 9 – New Athens, St. Clairsville, Cadiz	
1.000 mi = 1.609 km; 1.000 km = 0.621 mi: Concurrency terminus
