= Captina =

Captina may refer to:

- Captina, Ohio, an unincorporated community
- Captina, West Virginia, a community in Marshall County
- Captina Creek, a creek in Belmont and Monroe Counties, Ohio
- Captina Island, an island on the Ohio River in Marshall County, West Virginia
