= Badgertown, Ohio =

Unincorporated community in Ohio, U.S.

Coordinates: 40°01′47″N 81°04′55″W

Badgertown is an unincorporated community in Goshen Township, Belmont County, Ohio, northwest of Bethesda. It appeared on the 1888 H. C. Mead & Co. map of Goshen Township, although has since been mostly absorbed by Bethesda.

Badgertown is part of the Wheeling, WV-OH Metropolitan Statistical Area.
