= Stan Goletz =

American baseball player (1918–1997)

- Pinch hitter
- Born: May 21, 1918; Crescent, Ohio, U.S.
- Died: June 7, 1997 (aged 79); Temple, Texas, U.S.
- Batted: Left Threw: Left

MLB debut
- September 9, 1941, for the Chicago White Sox

Last MLB appearance
- September 26, 1941, for the Chicago White Sox

MLB statistics
- Games played: 5
- At bats: 5
- Hits: 3
- Stats at Baseball Reference

Teams
- Chicago White Sox (1941)

Stanley Goletz (May 21, 1918 – June 7, 1997) was an American professional baseball pinch hitter in Major League Baseball. Nicknamed "Stash", he played for the Chicago White Sox in 1941.
