= Smith Township, Ohio =

Smith Township, Ohio may refer to:

- Smith Township, Belmont County, Ohio
- Smith Township, Mahoning County, Ohio
