= Uniontown =

Uniontown may refer to:

- Uniontown, Alabama
- Uniontown, Arkansas
- Uniontown, former name of Lotus, California
- Uniontown, Jackson County, Indiana
- Uniontown, Perry County, Indiana
- Uniontown, Kansas
- Uniontown, Kentucky
- Uniontown, Maryland
- Uniontown, Missouri
- Uniontown, Ohio (Stark County)
- Uniontown, Belmont County, Ohio
- Uniontown, Pennsylvania
- Uniontown, Washington
- Uniontown, the original name of the Anacostia Historic District neighborhood in Washington, D.C.

== See also ==
- Union Town (disambiguation)
