= James Kinney Farmstead =

Historic house in Ohio, United States

- U.S. National Register of Historic Places
- U.S. Historic district
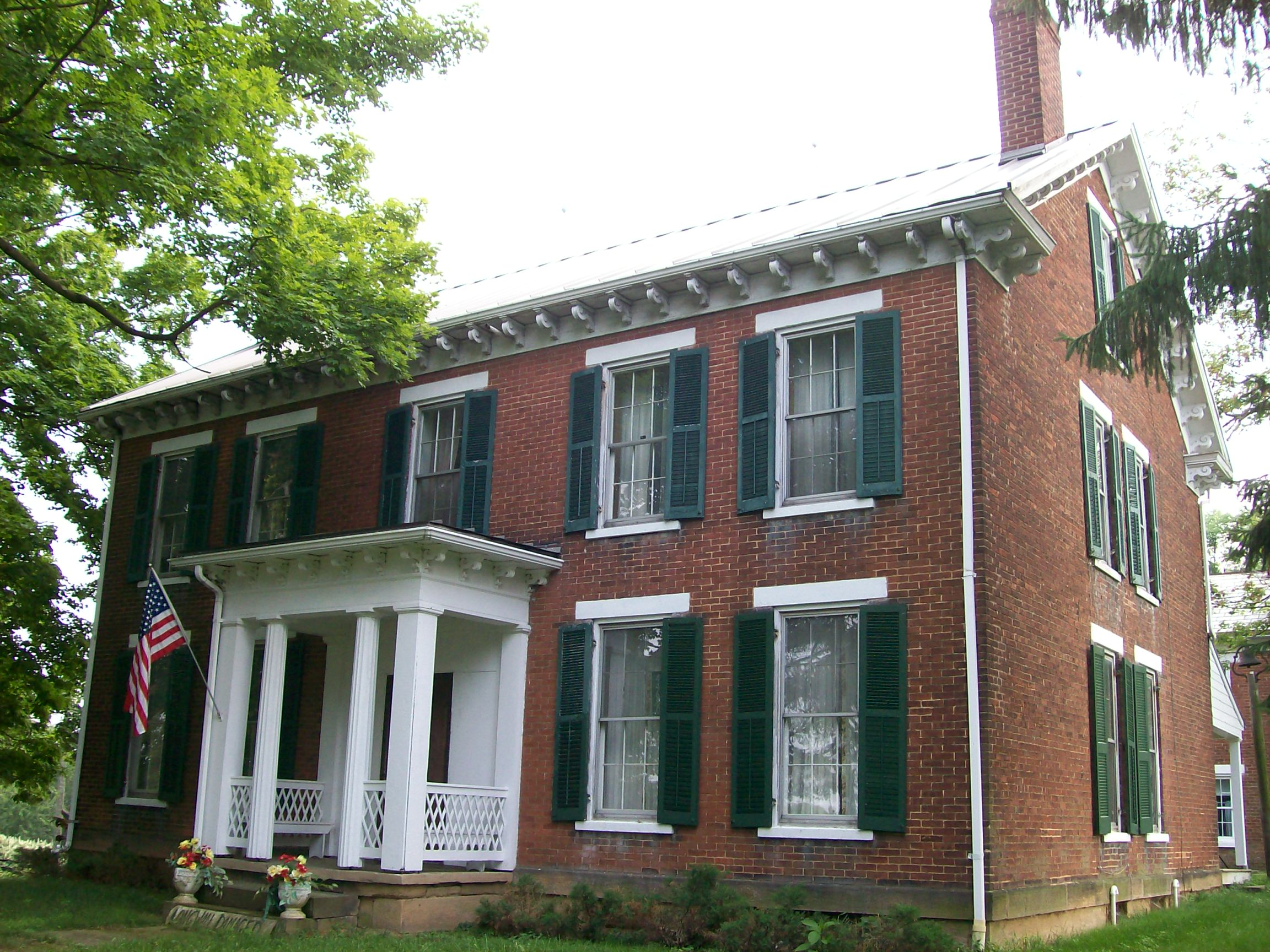
- The house on James Kinney Farmstead

- Location within Ohio Location within the United States
- Nearest city: Belmont, Ohio
- Coordinates: 39°59′52″N 80°59′34″W
- Built: 1863
- Architectural style: Greek Revival, Italianate
- NRHP reference No.: 99000510
- Added to NRHP: April 29, 1999

The James Kinney Farmstead, also known as Country Mile Farm, is located 4 miles (6.4 km) southeast of Belmont, Ohio on SR 147. The 57-acre (23 ha) property was placed on the National Register on 1999-04-29 and is only one of four farmsteads placed on the Register.

== History ==
The property was bought by James Kinney in 1852 from John Franz. The property contained a simple log structure which once stood close to the present house. The house was built in 1863 and is largely the same as it was when first constructed. This property once served as a drove station and saw hundreds of drovers and livestock passing the house. The property was purchased in 1957 by the late Floyd Simpson and is currently undergoing restoration by his sons.

== Exterior ==
The house is constructed in the Greek Revival style and consists of red bricks with white wooden trim boards. Rectangular windows with dark shutters pierce the facade. The front of the house contains a central portico supported by Doric columns in antis. The front entrance is reached by a flight of stairs and is framed by a pair of windows to either side. The second floor contains five windows in line with the windows and door located below.

The grounds surrounding the house contains a smokehouse, a summer kitchen, a wood and coal house, corncrib-wagon shed, and a carriage house. A timber-frame barn is located to the south of the house and was built in 1874 out of white pine and poplar. The oldest structure on the property is across SR 147 from the barn and was on the property before James Kinney purchased the property.

The property also features a 190-foot (58 m) loess mound, a section of the original drovers' road, and 5 acres (2.0 ha) of virgin forest connected to Dysart Woods.
