= Belmont Historic District (Belmont, Ohio) =

Historic district in Ohio, United States

- U.S. National Register of Historic Places
- U.S. Historic district
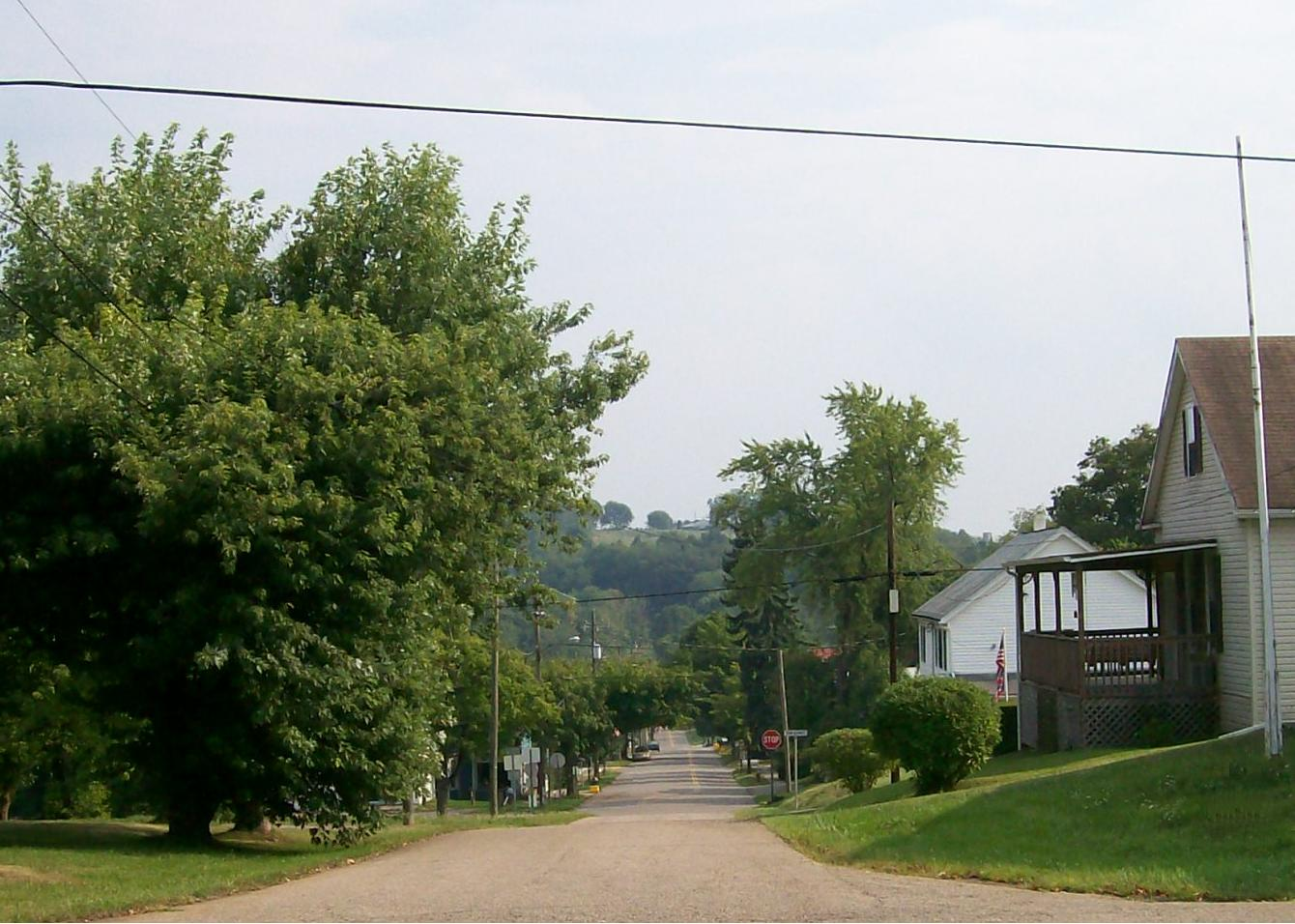
- SR 147 in the Belmont, Ohio Historic District

- Location within Ohio Location within the United States
- Location: Roughly bounded by Barrister, John, Jefferson, Sycamore, and Bridge Sts., Belmont, Ohio
- Coordinates: 40°1′40″N 81°2′27″W
- Area: 75 acres (30 ha)
- Built: 1820
- Architectural style: Greek Revival, Gothic Revival
- NRHP reference No.: 87000422
- Added to NRHP: March 13, 1987

The Belmont Historic District is located in Belmont, Ohio and contains several streets. The buildings located in the district are primarily from the 19th century, but are punctuated by more recent buildings. The district is split by SR 147 and SR 149. The historic district was placed on the National Register in 1987.

It was deemed an "architecturally cohesive rural village" and includes hewn log houses, vernacular frame buildings, brick I-houses, and Greek Revival-style houses and commercial buildings.
