= Alledonia, Ohio =

Unincorporated community in Ohio, U.S.

Coordinates: 39°53′55″N 80°58′09″W

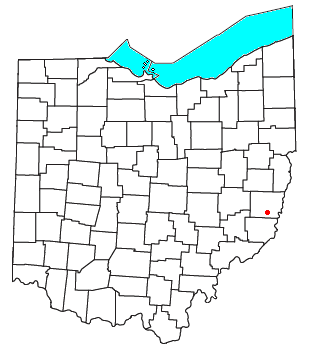
Location of Alledonia, Ohio

Alledonia is an unincorporated community in central Washington Township, Belmont County, Ohio, United States. It has a post office with the ZIP code 43902. It lies along State Route 148.

Alledonia is part of the Wheeling, WV-OH Metropolitan Statistical Area.
