= Riverview, Belmont County, Ohio =

Unincorporated community

Coordinates: 40°03′28″N 80°44′06″W

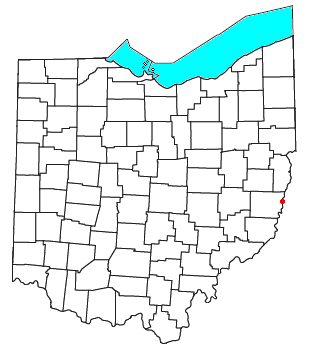
Location of Riverview, Ohio

Riverview is an unincorporated community along State Route 7 in northeastern Pultney Township, Belmont County, Ohio, United States, between Bridgeport and Bellaire. At one time, Riverview was a small unincorporated village, but it was demolished over time to make way for Interstate 470 near its crossing of the Ohio River. Its remains are still visible from Route 7 during late fall, winter and early spring.
