= York Township, Belmont County, Ohio =

Township in Ohio, US

- Township
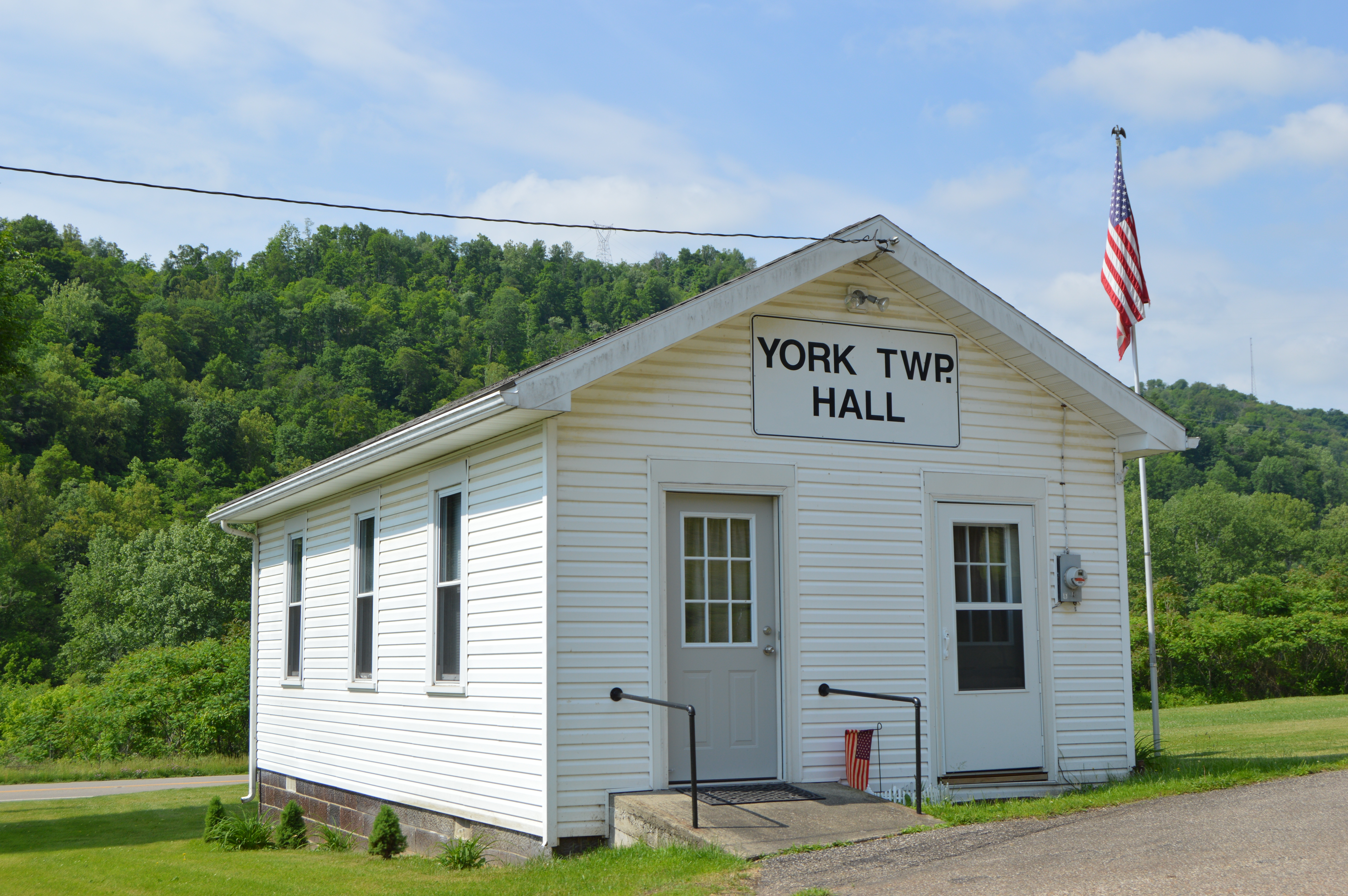
- Township hall at Steinersville

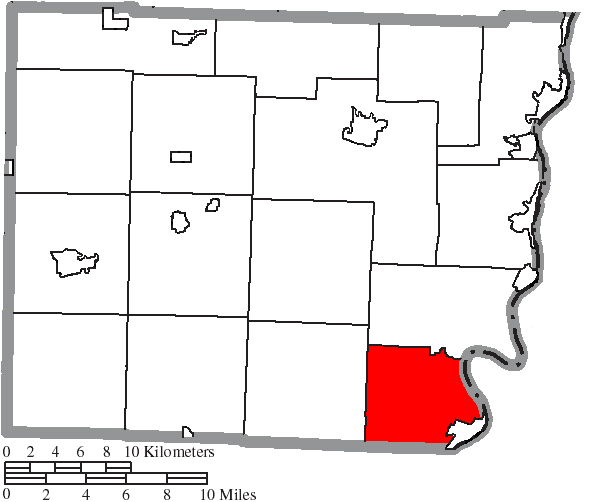
- Location of York Township in Belmont County
- Coordinates: 39°52′10″N 80°49′35″W
- Country: United States
- State: Ohio
- County: Belmont

Area
  - Total: 26.0 sq mi (67.3 km^{2})
  - Land: 25.6 sq mi (66.2 km^{2})
  - Water: 0.46 sq mi (1.2 km^{2})
- Elevation: 850 ft (260 m)

Population (2020)
  - Total: 2,320
  - Density: 90.8/sq mi (35.0/km^{2})
- Time zone: UTC-5 (Eastern (EST))
  - Summer (DST): UTC-4 (EDT)
- FIPS code: 39-86996
- GNIS feature ID: 1085791

York Township is one of the sixteen townships of Belmont County, Ohio, United States. The 2020 census found 2,320 people in the township.

== Geography ==
Located in the southeastern corner of the county along the Ohio River, it borders the following townships:

- Mead Township – north
- Switzerland Township, Monroe County – south
- Washington Township – west

Marshall County, West Virginia, lies across the Ohio River to the east.

The village of Powhatan Point is located in southeastern York Township along the Ohio River.

== Name and history ==
It is one of ten York Townships statewide.

In February 2018, an explosion and blowout in a natural gas well in York Township owned by XTO Energy was detected by the Copernicus Sentinel-5P satellite's Tropospheric Monitoring Instrument. About 30 homes were evacuated, and brine and produced water were discharged into streams flowing into the Ohio River.

The methane leak lasted 20 days, releasing more than 50,000 tons of methane, a potent greenhouse gas, into the atmosphere. The blowout leaked more methane than is discharged by most European nations in a year from their oil and gas industries.

== Government ==
The township is governed by a three-member board of trustees, who are elected in November of odd-numbered years to a four-year term beginning on the following January 1. Two are elected in the year after the presidential election and one is elected in the year before it. There is also an elected township fiscal officer, who serves a four-year term beginning on April 1 of the year after the election, which is held in November of the year before the presidential election. Vacancies in the fiscal officership or on the board of trustees are filled by the remaining trustees.
