= Captina, Ohio =

Unincorporated community in Ohio, U.S.

Coordinates: 39°53′15″N 80°52′15″W

Captina is an unincorporated community in Belmont County, in the U.S. state of Ohio.

== History ==
A post office was in operation at Captina from 1816 until 1907. The community took its name from nearby Captina Creek.
