= Centerville, Belmont County, Ohio =

Unincorporated community in Ohio, U.S.

Coordinates: 39°58′33″N 80°57′55″W

Centerville is an unincorporated community in Belmont County, in the U.S. state of Ohio.

== History ==
Centerville was laid out in 1817, and most likely was named for its location near the geographical center of Smith Township. An old variant name of Centerville was Demos. A post office called Demos was established in 1837, and remained in operation until 1923.
