= Dysart Woods =

Tract of old growth forest in Ohio, U.S.

- Location within Ohio
- Location: Belmont County, Ohio
- Nearest city: Belmont
- Coordinates: 39.9846°N 80.9976°W
- Area: 50 acres (20 ha)
- Governing body: Ohio University

U.S. National Natural Landmark
- Designated: 1967

Dysart Woods is the largest remaining tract of old-growth forest in southeastern Ohio. It is located in the unglaciated Allegheny Plateau in Belmont County almost five miles (8 km) from the village of Belmont on Ohio State Route 147.

== History ==
The tract currently known as Dysart Woods was once part of a 455-acre (1.84 km^{2}) plot owned by Orin B. Dysart. Upon his death the property passed to his nieces, Gladys Dysart McGaughy and Margaret Dysart. The nieces held the land for years, rejecting attractive offers from lumber companies and coal companies to eventually sell the land to the Nature Conservancy for a much smaller sum. Ohio University eventually acquired the land and a formal dedication was held May 25, 1968.

== The Woods ==
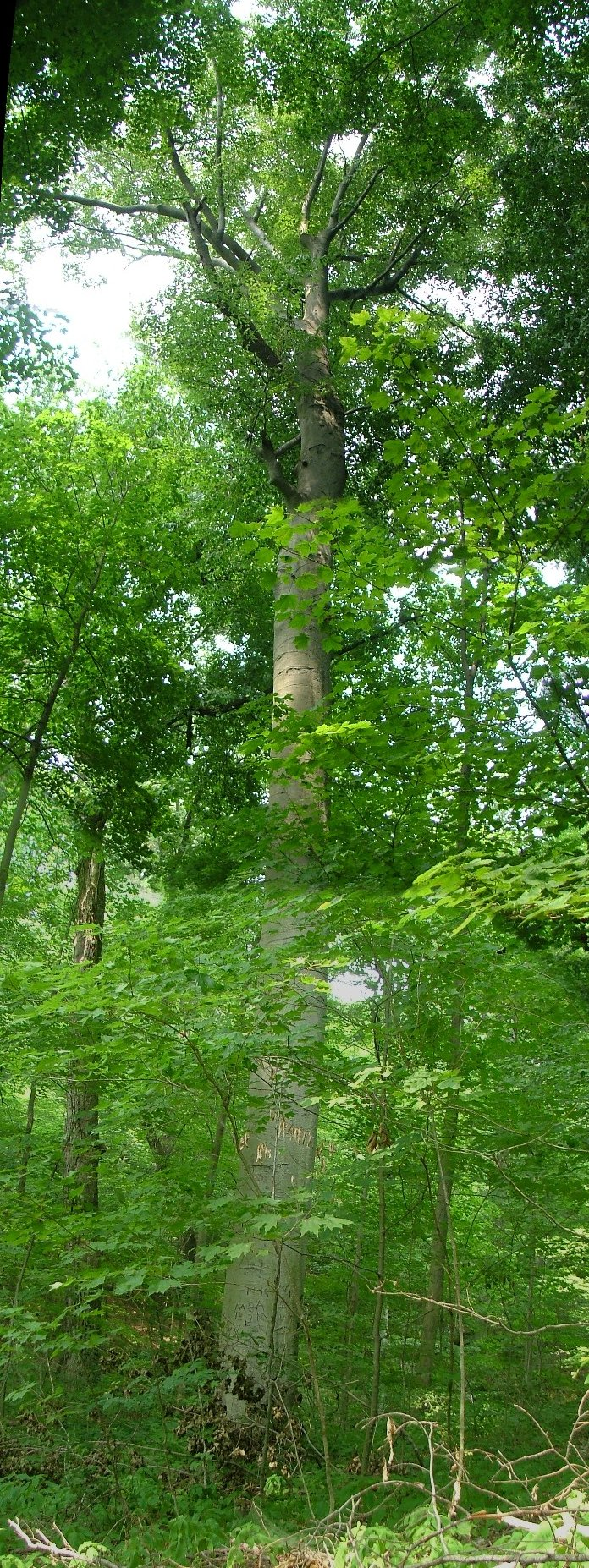
American Beech in Dysart Woods

The area is currently an outdoor laboratory run by Ohio University. The property was designated a National Natural Landmark in 1967. White oak, Red Oak and Tulip Poplar trees are a few of the seventeen species recorded in the woods. Several of the trees are 300–400 years old and several range over 4 feet (1.2 m) in diameter.

The woods contain two foot trails (marked red and blue) which wind through the woods. The trails are lightly marked and are the only sign of human interference, although nothing is deeply disturbed so as to allow nature to take its course.

The farmhouse located at the entrance of the woods was once the homestead of the Dysarts. When Ohio University took over the woods, the farmhouse was converted into a stopping point for visitors and students alike.

There has been controversy over plans for underground coal mining by Ohio Valley Coal Company for several years. On March 5, 2007, the Ohio Seventh District Court of Appeals ruled in favor of the OVCC to allow mining under and adjacent to Dysart Woods.

In 2010, Ohio Valley Coal Company excavated a room-and-pillar coal mine 500 feet under the woods. Within a year after the mining was complete, half of the old-growth trees—mostly white oaks—had died, due to the changes in hydrology caused by the coal mine.
