= Captina Creek =

Location
- Country: United States
- State: Ohio
- Region: Midwest
- District: Southern Belmont County, Northern Monroe County

Physical characteristics
- Source: North Fork Captina Creek
  - location: Near Barnesville, Belmont County, Ohio
- Mouth: Ohio River
  - location: Powhatan Point, Belmont County, Ohio
  - coordinates: 39°51′36″N 80°48′03″W
- Length: 35 mi (56 km)
- Basin size: 227 mi^{2} (590 km^{2})
- Discharge
  - location: Armstrongs Mill
  - average: 163 cu ft/s (4.6 m^{3}/s), USGS water years 1927-1935 and 1959-2002
- Discharge
  - location: mouth
  - average: 226.72 cu ft/s (6.420 m^{3}/s) (estimate)

Captina Creek is a 35 miles (56 km) long creek located in southeastern Ohio, and a tributary of the Ohio River. Captina Creek is an important creek to the region and home to about 56 species of fish.

== History ==
In April 1774, the frontiersman Michael Cresap was accused of killing two Indians at the mouth of Captina Creek in revenge for the murder of a white trader earlier that month. He was later exonerated, but this and the subsequent Yellow Creek Massacre were the flashpoint incidents that set off Lord Dunmore's War. There is a plaque located inside a gazebo on the Powhatan Point village fair grounds dedicated to George Washington at the mouth of the creek. The plaque states that Washington had set camp for a night at the mouth of Captina creek while exploring the Ohio Valley.

The gas industry has a heavy presence in Belmont County, and has caused several spills that may have damaged the ecosystem around Captina Creek.

== Ecology ==
Captina Creek is home to some 56 known species of fish. The surrounding area is also home to many diverse plant life and rare and endangered species such as the bobcat and the Eastern Hellbender.

== Geography ==
Captina Creek is located in the southeastern part of Ohio. The creek is paralleled by State Route 148, which runs from the mouth at the Ohio river, past the source near Barnesville. Chestnut Creek and Barnesville Reservoir Number Two are the main sources for the creek, which flows southeast towards the Ohio River.

== See also ==
- List of rivers of Ohio
