= Union Town =

Union Town may refer to:

- Union Town, California, former name of Arcata, California
- Union Town, New Jersey
- Union Town, New York
- Union Town (album), a 2011 album by The Nightwatchman
- Union Town (film), a 2026 American documentary film

== See also ==
- Uniontown (disambiguation)
