= Boston, Belmont County, Ohio =

Unincorporated community in Ohio, U.S.

Coordinates: 39°53′17″N 81°11′54″W

Boston is an unincorporated community in Belmont County, in the U.S. state of Ohio.

== History ==
Boston was laid out in 1834. At the beginning of the 20th century, Boston had about 100 inhabitants.
