= Egypt, Belmont County, Ohio =

Extinct town in Ohio, U.S.

Coordinates: 40°05′06″N 81°07′40″W

Egypt is an extinct town in Belmont County, in the U.S. state of Ohio. The GNIS classifies it as a populated place.

== History ==
Egypt originally was built up around a gristmill which was started there in 1826. A post office called Egypt Mills operated from 1852 until 1857; another post office called Egypt operated from 1883 until 1905.

The GEM of Egypt was a large stripping shovel which worked the Egypt Valley coal field.
