= Sewellsville, Ohio =

Unincorporated community in Ohio, U.S.

Coordinates: 40°05′53″N 81°12′47″W

Sewellsville is an unincorporated community in Belmont County, in the U.S. state of Ohio.

== History ==
The first settlement at Sewellsville, then called Union, was made around 1815. A post office called Sewellsville was established in 1834, and remained in operation until 1907. The present name honors Peter Sewell, the first postmaster.
