= Jacobsburg, Ohio =

Human settlement in Ohio, United States

Coordinates: 39.965°N 80.904°W

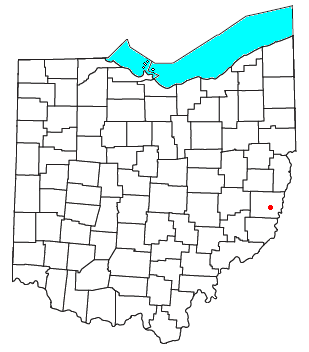
Location of Jacobsburg, Ohio

Jacobsburg is an unincorporated community in southeastern Smith Township, Belmont County, Ohio, United States. It has a post office with the ZIP code 43933. It lies along State Route 147.

Jacobsburg is part of the Wheeling, WV-OH Metropolitan Statistical Area.

== History ==
Jacobsburg was laid out in 1815 by Jacob Calvert, and most likely was named for him. A post office called Jacobsburg has been in operation since 1824. Besides the post office, Jacobsburg had a tavern and two stores.
