= Pleasant Grove, Belmont County, Ohio =

Unincorporated community in Ohio, U.S.

Coordinates: 40°09′01″N 80°50′32″W

Pleasant Grove is an unincorporated community in Belmont County, in the U.S. state of Ohio.

== History ==
The first settlement at Pleasant Grove was made in 1825. The community was descriptively named. A post office called Plank Road was established in 1854, the name was changed to Pleasant Grove in 1871, and the post office closed in 1909.
