= Businessburg, Ohio =

Unincorporated community in Ohio, U.S.

Coordinates: 39°55′53″N 80°51′01″W

Businessburg is an unincorporated community in Belmont County, in the U.S. state of Ohio.

== History ==
A post office called Businessburgh was established in 1862, the name was changed to Businessburg in 1894, and the post office closed in 1907. Besides the post office, Businessburg had a mill, built in 1848.
