= Hunter, Belmont County, Ohio =

Unincorporated community in Ohio, U.S.

Coordinates: 39°56′52″N 81°03′26″W

Hunter is an unincorporated community in Belmont County, in the U.S. state of Ohio.

== History ==
Hunter was laid out in 1849, and named for W. F. Hunter, an Ohio congressman. A post office named Hunter was established in 1850, and remained in operation until 1907.
