= Mead Township, Belmont County, Ohio =

Township in Ohio, US

- Township
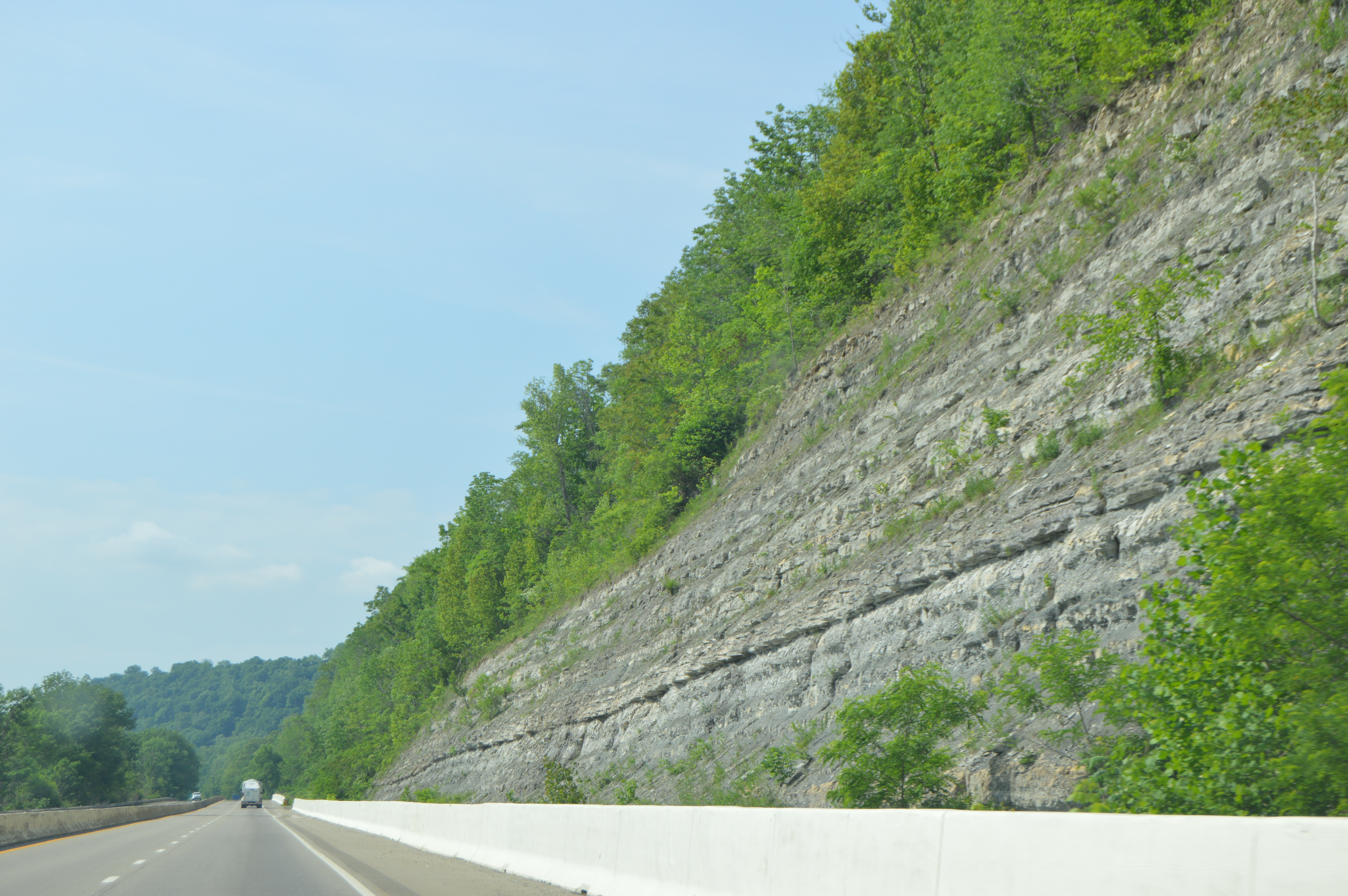
- Cliffs along State Route 7

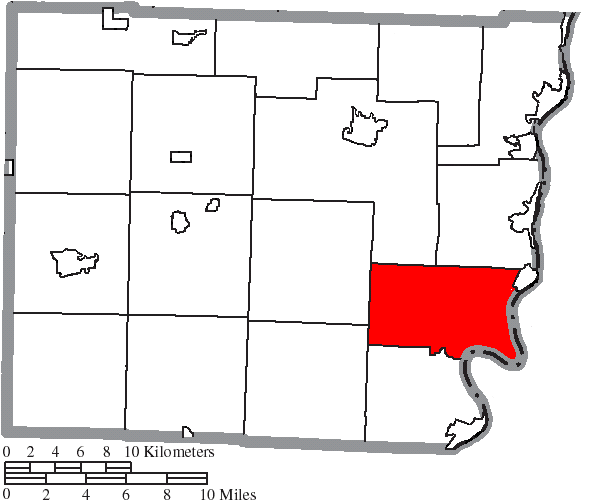
- Location of Mead Township in Belmont County
- Coordinates: 39°57′32″N 80°47′22″W
- Country: United States
- State: Ohio
- County: Belmont

Area
  - Total: 32.0 sq mi (83.0 km^{2})
  - Land: 31.9 sq mi (82.7 km^{2})
  - Water: 0.15 sq mi (0.4 km^{2})
- Elevation: 1,066 ft (325 m)

Population (2020)
  - Total: 5,430
  - Density: 170/sq mi (65.7/km^{2})
- Time zone: UTC-5 (Eastern (EST))
  - Summer (DST): UTC-4 (EDT)
- FIPS code: 39-48580
- GNIS feature ID: 1085780
- Website: https://www.meadtownship.com/

Mead Township is one of the sixteen townships of Belmont County, Ohio, United States. The 2020 census found 5,430 people in the township.

== Geography ==
Located in the southeastern part of the county along the Ohio River, it borders the following townships:

- Pultney Township – northeast
- York Township – south
- Washington Township – southwest
- Smith Township – west
- Richland Township – northwest

Marshall County, West Virginia, lies across the Ohio River to the east.

Most of the village of Shadyside is located in northeastern Mead Township, along the Ohio River.

== Name and history ==
Mead is the name of the mother of Col. David Lockwood, Revolutionary War veteran and pioneer settler.

It is the only Mead Township statewide.

== Government ==
The township is governed by a three-member board of trustees, who are elected in November of odd-numbered years to a four-year term beginning on the following January 1. Two are elected in the year after the presidential election and one is elected in the year before it. There is also an elected township fiscal officer, who serves a four-year term beginning on April 1 of the year after the election, which is held in November of the year before the presidential election. Vacancies in the fiscal officership or on the board of trustees are filled by the remaining trustees.
