= Powhatan Point, Ohio =

- Village
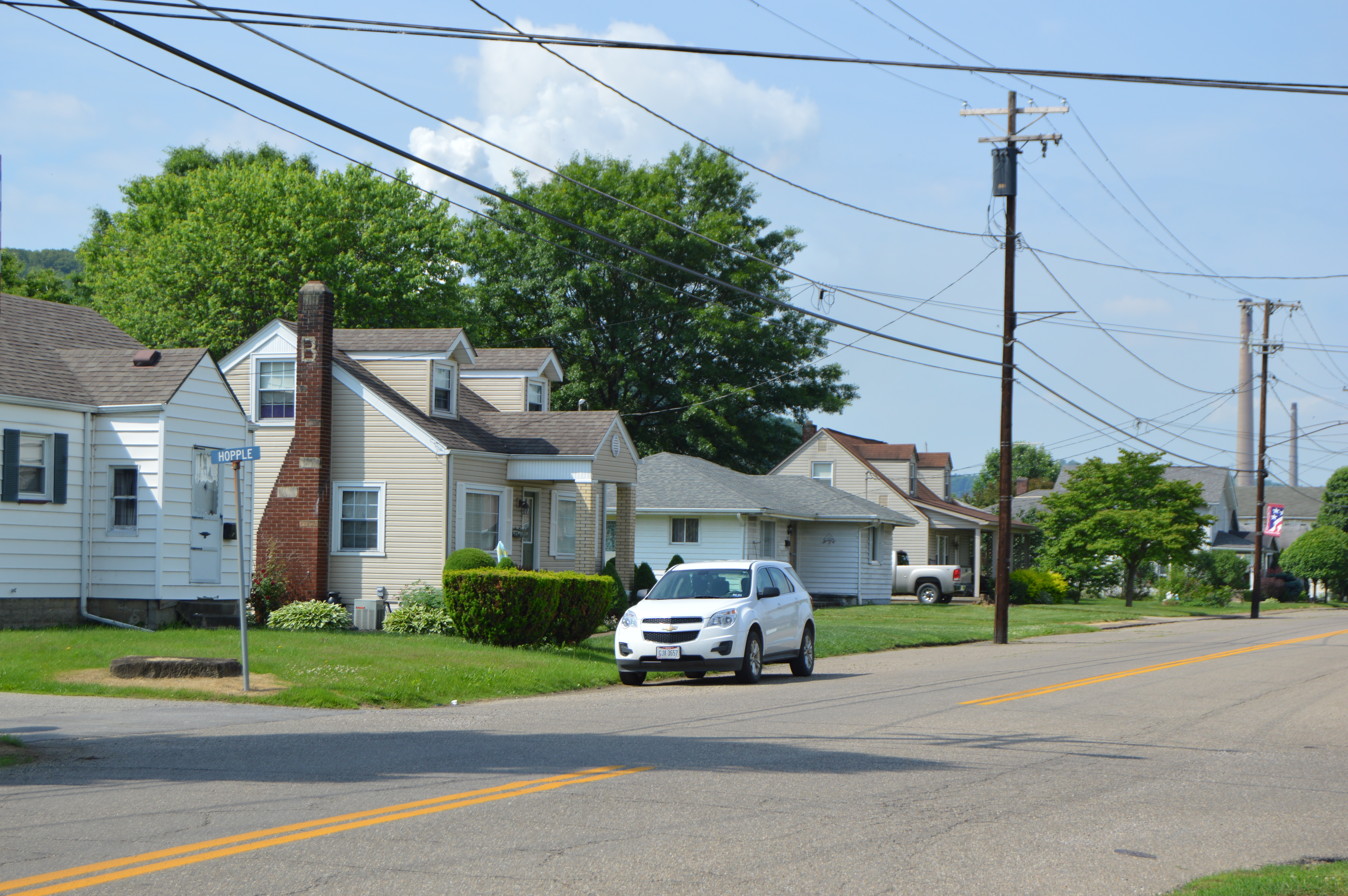
- Houses on Main Street

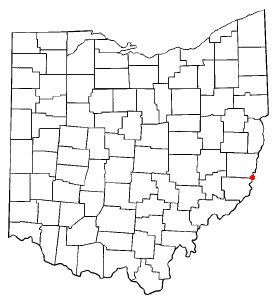
- Location of Powhatan Point, Ohio

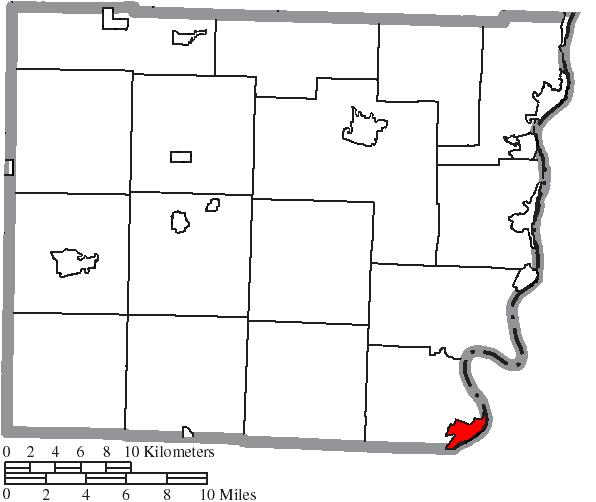
- Location of Powhatan Point in Belmont County
- Coordinates: 39°51′55″N 80°47′50″W
- Country: United States
- State: Ohio
- County: Belmont
- Township: York
- Founded: 1849

Government
  - Mayor: Jeff Haught

Area
  - Total: 1.63 sq mi (4.23 km^{2})
  - Land: 1.47 sq mi (3.81 km^{2})
  - Water: 0.16 sq mi (0.42 km^{2})
- Elevation: 646 ft (197 m)

Population (2020)
  - Total: 1,461
  - Density: 994.2/sq mi (383.87/km^{2})
- Time zone: UTC-5 (Eastern (EST))
  - Summer (DST): UTC-4 (EDT)
- ZIP code: 43942
- Area code: 740
- FIPS code: 39-64542
- GNIS feature ID: 2399016

Powhatan Point is a village in southeastern Belmont County, Ohio, United States, along the Ohio River. The population was 1,461 at the 2020 census. It is part of the Wheeling metropolitan area.

While "Powhatan" likely memorializes the Native-American tribe of the same name, the "Point" in the town's name refers to the confluence between the Captina Creek and the Ohio River. Powhatan Point is the closest town on the Ohio side of Captina Island in the Ohio River.

== History ==
Powhatan Point was platted in 1849. A post office called Powhatan Point has been in operation since 1828.

== Geography ==
According to the United States Census Bureau, the village has a total area of 1.63 square miles (4.22 km^{2}), of which 1.47 square miles (3.81 km^{2}) is land and 0.16 square miles (0.41 km^{2}) is water.

== Demographics ==
Historical population
Census	Pop.	Note	%±
1880	225		—
1900	470		—
1910	415		−11.7%
1920	406		−2.2%
1930	2,329		473.6%
1940	2,054		−11.8%
1950	2,135		3.9%
1960	2,147		0.6%
1970	2,167		0.9%
1980	2,181		0.6%
1990	1,807		−17.1%
2000	1,744		−3.5%
2010	1,592		−8.7%
2020	1,461		−8.2%
U.S. Decennial Census

=== 2010 census ===
As of the census of 2010, there were 1,592 people, 710 households, and 462 families living in the village. The population density was 1,083.0 inhabitants per square mile (418.1/km^{2}). There were 792 housing units at an average density of 538.8 per square mile (208.0/km^{2}). The racial makeup of the village was 98.7% White, 0.4% African American, 0.3% Native American, 0.1% Asian, 0.1% from other races, and 0.6% from two or more races. Hispanic or Latino of any race were 0.3% of the population.

There were 710 households, of which 28.3% had children under the age of 18 living with them, 45.4% were married couples living together, 15.2% had a female householder with no husband present, 4.5% had a male householder with no wife present, and 34.9% were non-families. 30.6% of all households were made up of individuals, and 13.9% had someone living alone who was 65 years of age or older. The average household size was 2.24 and the average family size was 2.74.

The median age in the village was 43.6 years. 21.4% of residents were under the age of 18; 8% were between the ages of 18 and 24; 22.4% were from 25 to 44; 30.6% were from 45 to 64; and 17.5% were 65 years of age or older. The gender makeup of the village was 47.8% male and 52.2% female.

=== 2000 census ===
As of the census of 2000, there were 1,744 people, 760 households, and 515 families living in the village. The population density was 1,119.7 inhabitants per square mile (432.3/km^{2}). There were 830 housing units at an average density of 532.9 per square mile (205.8/km^{2}). The racial makeup of the village was 98.11% White, 0.57% African American, 0.06% Native American, and 1.26% from two or more races. Hispanic or Latino of any race were 0.23% of the population.

There were 760 households, out of which 27.5% had children under the age of 18 living with them, 52.9% were married couples living together, 11.1% had a female householder with no husband present, and 32.2% were non-families. 28.2% of all households were made up of individuals, and 14.9% had someone living alone who was 65 years of age or older. The average household size was 2.29 and the average family size was 2.78.

In the village, the population was spread out, with 21.3% under the age of 18, 8.5% from 18 to 24, 27.1% from 25 to 44, 25.6% from 45 to 64, and 17.5% who were 65 years of age or older. The median age was 41 years. For every 100 females, there were 90.0 males. For every 100 females age 18 and over, there were 83.8 males.

The median income for a household in the village was $24,875, and the median income for a family was $32,546. Males had a median income of $32,039 versus $16,583 for females. The per capita income for the village was $14,570. About 16.7% of families and 19.8% of the population were below the poverty line, including 27.2% of those under age 18 and 16.2% of those age 65 or over.

== Economy ==
Although the village's economy was once largely supported by the coal industry, most residents currently seek employment outside village limits in nearby towns and cities such as Moundsville and Wheeling, West Virginia.

== Education ==
Powhatan Point currently has a K–8 elementary school. After elementary promotion, the majority of students attend River High School, located in Hannibal, a school that also draws students from other small Ohio River villages, such as Clarington, Sardis, Hannibal, and Cameron.

Powhatan Point has a public library, a branch of the Belmont County District Library.

== See also ==
- List of cities and towns along the Ohio River
