= Lamira, Ohio =

Unincorporated community in Ohio, U.S.

Coordinates: 40°01′27″N 80°59′16″W

Lamira is an unincorporated community in Belmont County, in the U.S. state of Ohio.

== History ==
Lamira was originally called Lewis' Mills, and under the latter name had its start in the mid-19th century when Jacob and Ira Lewis built a mill there. A post office called Lamira was established in 1850, and remained in operation until 1967.

== Notable people ==
- Earl R. Lewis, member of the U.S. House of Representatives from Ohio's 18th district
- Susanna M. Salter, born in Lamira, first woman elected to be a mayor in the United States in Argonia, Kansas
