= Uniontown, Belmont County, Ohio =

Unincorporated community in Ohio, U.S.

Coordinates: 40°07′50″N 80°59′30″W

Uniontown is an unincorporated community in Belmont County, in the U.S. state of Ohio.

== History ==
A post office called Uniontown was established in 1820, and remained in operation until 1912. Besides the post office, Uniontown had several stores, a schoolhouse, and church.
