= Steinersville, Ohio =

Unincorporated community in Ohio, U.S.

Coordinates: 39°52′08″N 80°49′52″W

Steinersville is an unincorporated community in Belmont County, in the U.S. state of Ohio.

== History ==
Steinersville was laid out in 1831 by John W. Steiner, and named for him.
