= Stewartsville, Ohio =

Unincorporated community in Ohio, U.S.

Coordinates: 40°00′43″N 80°51′29″W

Stewartsville is an unincorporated community in Belmont County, in the U.S. state of Ohio.

== History ==
A post office called Stewartsville was established in 1873, and remained in operation until 1998. The community was named for John Stewart, a businessperson in the local mining industry.

== Notable people ==
- Sam Jones, Major League Baseball pitcher
- Shag Thomas, professional wrestler, champion
