= Washington Township, Belmont County, Ohio =

Township in Ohio, US

- Township
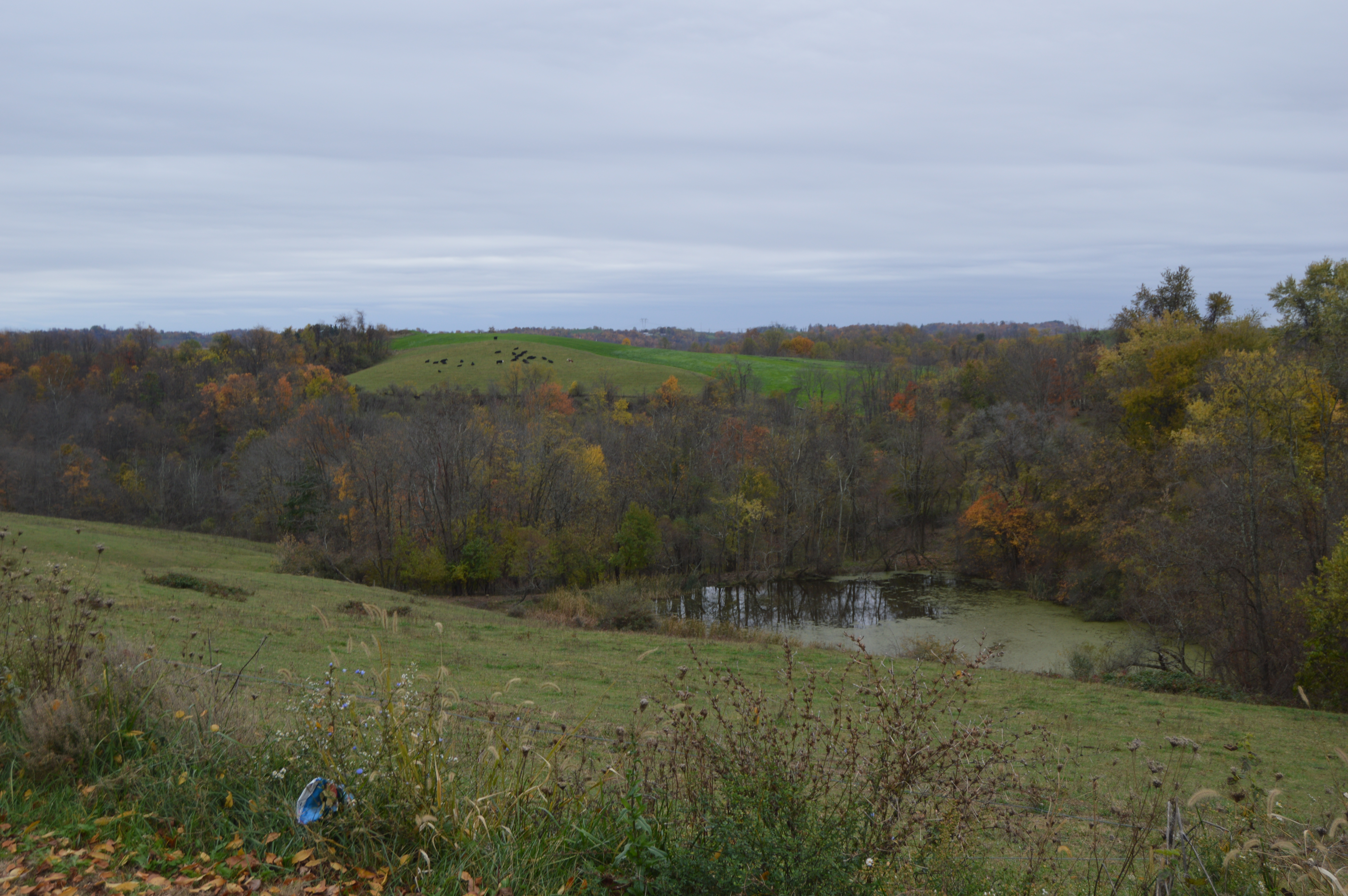
- Countryside along Clover Ridge Road

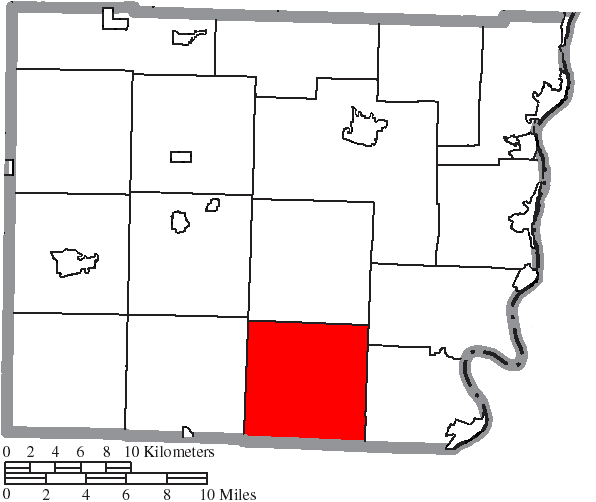
- Location of Washington Township in Belmont County
- Coordinates: 39°54′9″N 80°57′12″W
- Country: United States
- State: Ohio
- County: Belmont

Area
  - Total: 35.9 sq mi (92.9 km^{2})
  - Land: 35.4 sq mi (91.7 km^{2})
  - Water: 0.50 sq mi (1.3 km^{2})
- Elevation: 1,165 ft (355 m)

Population (2020)
  - Total: 505
  - Density: 14.3/sq mi (5.51/km^{2})
- Time zone: UTC-5 (Eastern (EST))
  - Summer (DST): UTC-4 (EDT)
- FIPS code: 39-81088
- GNIS feature ID: 1085788

Washington Township is one of the sixteen townships of Belmont County, Ohio, United States. The 2020 census found 505 people in the township.

== Geography ==
Located in the southern part of the county, it borders the following townships:

- Smith Township - north
- Mead Township - northeast
- York Township - east
- Switzerland Township, Monroe County - southeast
- Sunsbury Township, Monroe County - southwest
- Wayne Township - west

No municipalities are located in Washington Township, although the unincorporated community of Alledonia lies in the township's center.

== Name and history ==
Washington Township was organized about 1831.

It is one of forty-three Washington Townships statewide.

== Government ==
The township is governed by a three-member board of trustees, who are elected in November of odd-numbered years to a four-year term beginning on the following January 1. Two are elected in the year after the presidential election and one is elected in the year before it. There is also an elected township fiscal officer, who serves a four-year term beginning on April 1 of the year after the election, which is held in November of the year before the presidential election. Vacancies in the fiscal officership or on the board of trustees are filled by the remaining trustees.
