= McClainville, Ohio =

Unincorporated community in Ohio, U.S.

Coordinates: 40°01′24″N 80°47′34″W

McClainville is an unincorporated community in Belmont County, in the U.S. state of Ohio.

== History ==
A post office called McClainville was established in 1893, and remained in operation until 1907. Besides the post office, McClainville had a large brick factory.
