= Belmont County, Ohio =

County in Ohio, United States

- County
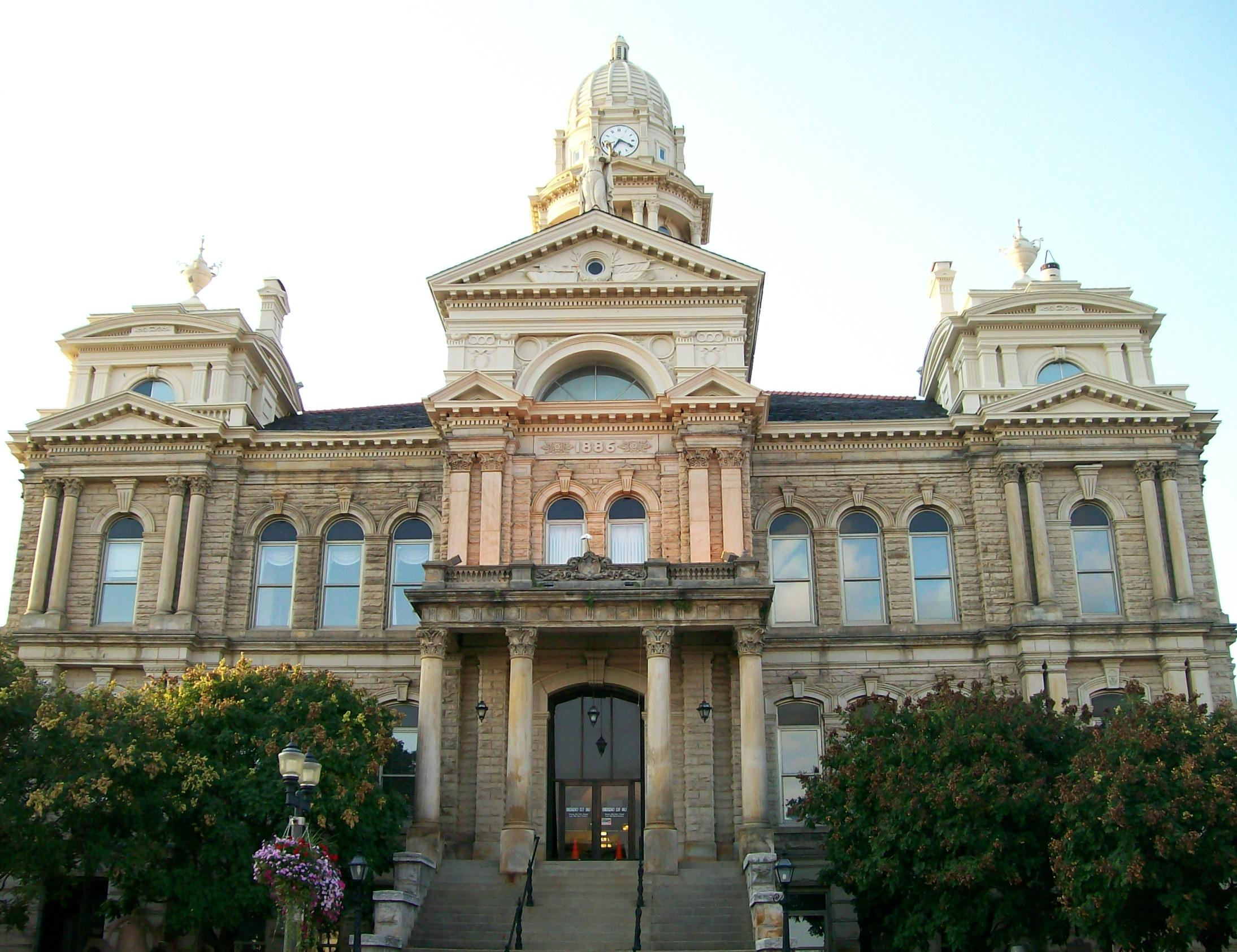
- Belmont County Courthouse

- Flag Seal
- Motto: Meliorem lapsa locavit (Latin, "He has planted one better than the one fallen")
- Location within the U.S. state of Ohio
- Coordinates: 40°01′N 80°59′W
- Country: United States
- State: Ohio
- Founded: September 7, 1801 (created); November 7, 1801 (organized)
- Named for: "beautiful mountain" in French
- Seat: St. Clairsville
- Largest city: Martins Ferry

Area
  - Total: 541.27 sq mi (1,401.9 km^{2})
  - Land: 532.13 sq mi (1,378.2 km^{2})
  - Water: 9.14 sq mi (23.7 km^{2}) 1.7%

Population (2020)
  - Total: 66,497
  - Estimate (2025): 64,434 ▼
  - Density: 120/sq mi (46/km^{2})
- Time zone: UTC−5 (Eastern)
  - Summer (DST): UTC−4 (EDT)
- Congressional district: 6th
- Website: www.belmontcountyohio.org

Belmont County is a county located in the eastern end of the U.S. state of Ohio. As of the 2020 United States census, the population was 66,497. Its county seat is St. Clairsville, while its largest city is Martins Ferry. The county was created on September 7, 1801, and organized on November 7, 1801. It takes its name from the French for "beautiful mountain".

Belmont County is part of the Wheeling metropolitan area.

== History ==
Belmont County was authorized in September 1801 by the Northwest Territorial legislature, with area partitioned from Jefferson and Washington counties. The county would be organized two months later with St. Clairsville being named as the county seat in 1803. Its area was reduced in 1810 when area was ceded for the formation of Guernsey County and again in 1813 for the formation of Monroe County. It has retained its boundaries unchanged since 1813. Belmont is the French toponym meaning "beautiful mountain". Settlers migrating westward followed Zane's Trace through the county. Later, the National Road was built through the county. Quakers were among the county's first settlers. Many of these people would become outspoken critics of slavery, including famous abolitionist Benjamin Lundy.

Some of the earliest settlers in Belmont County were the Vernons, Williamses and Thomases from Georgia; the Starbucks from Nantucket; the Pattersons, Bundys, Stantons, Edgertons, Doudnas, Boswells, Outlands, Halls, Middletons and Hansons from North Carolina; the Baileys from Southeastern Virginia, and the Smiths from Pennsylvania.

Belmont County is located in the Ohio coal belt. At one time, steamships traveling down the Ohio River knew the county's community of Bellaire as the last stop for coal until Cincinnati. In 1866, the county was served by the Baltimore and Ohio Railroad and the Toledo & Ohio Railroad. The National Road also ran through Bellaire. Given the county's transportation resources, fuel resource, and experienced workforce in nearby Wheeling, West Virginia, the county was an excellent location for a glass manufacturing plant. The county's first glass works was the Excelsior Glass Works, which was organized in 1849. In 1866 Belmont Glass Company became Bellaire's first of many glass plants, and the second in Belmont County. Some of the founders of this glass works later started another glass factory in Bellaire: the Bellaire Goblet Company. In 1880, the state of Ohio ranked fourth in the country in glass production, and Belmont County ranked sixth among the nation's counties. By 1881, Bellaire had 15 glass factories, and was known as "Glass City". At the beginning of the next decade, the state of Ohio was ranked second in the nation in glass production based on the value of the product.

Belmont County was the venue for the world-famous Jamboree in the Hills outdoor country music festival from 1977 to 2018. In 1986, the syndicated Paul Harvey Show featured a special election being held in Belmont County for purposes of selecting a new official county seal and flag, created by then-county resident Michael Massa.

== Geography ==
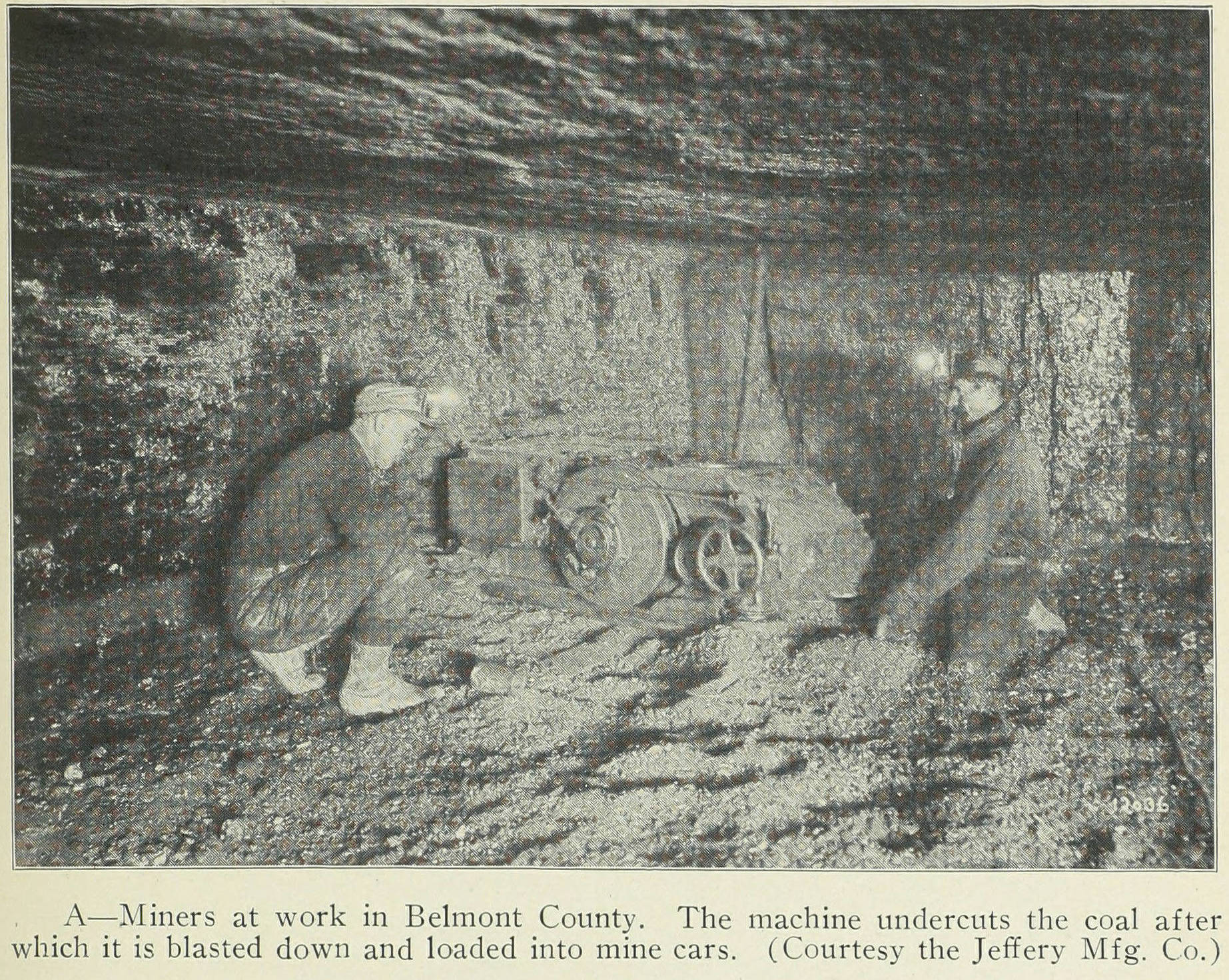
Coal miners in Belmont County, 1923

Belmont County lies on the east side of Ohio. Its east border abuts the west border of West Virginia (across the Ohio River). The Ohio flows southward along the county's east line. Captina Creek flows eastward through the lower part of the county, discharging into the Ohio at Powhatan Point, and McMahon Creek also flows eastward through the center of the county, discharging into the Ohio at Bellaire. The county terrain consists of low rolling hills, etched with drainages. All available area is devoted to agriculture. The terrain slopes to the east, with its highest point, Galloway Knob (1,396' or 426m ASL) at 1.2 miles (1.9 km) southeast of Lamira. The county has a total area of 541.27 sqmi (1492 km^{2}), of which 532.13 sqmi (1378 km^{2}) is land and 9.14 sqmi (23.69 km^{2}) (1.7%) is water.

=== Adjacent counties ===
- Harrison County – north
- Jefferson County – northeast
- Ohio County, West Virginia – east
- Marshall County, West Virginia – southeast
- Monroe County – south
- Noble County – southwest
- Guernsey County – west

=== Major highways ===
- I-70
- I-470
- US 40
- US 250
- SR 7
- SR 9
- SR 26
- SR 145
- SR 147
- SR 148
- SR 149
- SR 331
- SR 800
- SR 872

=== Protected areas ===
- Barkcamp State Park
- Dysart Woods Natural Monument
- Egypt Valley Wildlife Area

=== Lakes ===
- Barnesville Lake
- Barnesville Reservoir #3
- Belmont Lake
- Piedmont Lake (part)

== Demographics ==
Historical population
Census	Pop.	Note	%±
1810	11,097		—
1820	20,329		83.2%
1830	28,627		40.8%
1840	30,901		7.9%
1850	34,600		12.0%
1860	36,398		5.2%
1870	39,714		9.1%
1880	49,638		25.0%
1890	57,413		15.7%
1900	60,875		6.0%
1910	76,856		26.3%
1920	93,193		21.3%
1930	94,719		1.6%
1940	95,614		0.9%
1950	87,740		−8.2%
1960	83,864		−4.4%
1970	80,917		−3.5%
1980	82,569		2.0%
1990	71,074		−13.9%
2000	70,226		−1.2%
2010	70,400		0.2%
2020	66,497		−5.5%
2025 (est.)	64,434	▼	−3.1%
US Decennial Census; 1790–1960 1900–1990; 1990–2000 2020

=== 2020 census ===
As of the 2020 census, the county had a population of 66,497. The median age was 45.2 years. 19.1% of residents were under the age of 18 and 22.0% of residents were 65 years of age or older. For every 100 females there were 104.8 males, and for every 100 females age 18 and over there were 104.6 males age 18 and over.

The racial makeup of the county was 91.5% White, 3.2% Black or African American, 0.1% American Indian and Alaska Native, 0.4% Asian, <0.1% Native Hawaiian and Pacific Islander, 0.5% from some other race, and 4.3% from two or more races. Hispanic or Latino residents of any race comprised 1.2% of the population.

38.5% of residents lived in urban areas, while 61.5% lived in rural areas.

There were 27,333 households in the county, of which 25.6% had children under the age of 18 living in them. Of all households, 45.9% were married-couple households, 19.9% were households with a male householder and no spouse or partner present, and 27.0% were households with a female householder and no spouse or partner present. About 31.2% of all households were made up of individuals and 15.5% had someone living alone who was 65 years of age or older.

There were 31,618 housing units, of which 13.6% were vacant. Among occupied housing units, 73.3% were owner-occupied and 26.7% were renter-occupied. The homeowner vacancy rate was 1.6% and the rental vacancy rate was 12.7%.

=== Racial and ethnic composition ===
Belmont County, Ohio – Racial and ethnic composition Note: the US Census treats Hispanic/Latino as an ethnic category. This table excludes Latinos from the racial categories and assigns them to a separate category. Hispanics/Latinos may be of any race.
Race / ethnicity (NH = Non-Hispanic)	Pop 1980	Pop 1990	Pop 2000	Pop 2010	Pop 2020	% 1980	% 1990	% 2000	% 2010	% 2020
White alone (NH)	80,419	69,357	66,512	65,902	60,536	97.40%	97.58%	94.71%	93.61%	91.04%
Black or African American alone (NH)	1,590	1,290	2,547	2,815	2,071	1.93%	1.82%	3.63%	4.00%	3.11%
Native American or Alaska Native alone (NH)	42	75	92	85	83	0.05%	0.11%	0.13%	0.12%	0.12%
Asian alone (NH)	170	127	209	257	265	0.21%	0.18%	0.30%	0.37%	0.40%
Native Hawaiian or Pacific Islander alone (NH)	x	x	13	6	11	x	x	0.02%	0.01%	0.02%
Other race alone (NH)	64	31	65	46	130	0.08%	0.04%	0.09%	0.07%	0.20%
Mixed race or Multiracial (NH)	x	x	514	860	2,577	x	x	0.73%	1.22%	3.88%
Hispanic or Latino (any race)	284	194	274	429	824	0.34%	0.27%	0.39%	0.61%	1.24%
Total	82,569	71,074	70,226	70,400	66,497	100.00%	100.00%	100.00%	100.00%	100.00%

=== 2010 census ===
As of the 2010 United States census, there were 70,400 people, 28,679 households, and 18,761 families in the county. The population density was 132.3 people per square mile (51.1 people/km^{2}). There were 32,452 housing units at an average density of 61.0 units per square mile (23.6/km^{2}). The racial makeup of the county was 94.0% white, 4.0% black or African American, 0.4% Asian, 0.1% American Indian, 0.2% from other races, and 1.3% from two or more races. Those of Hispanic or Latino origin made up 0.6% of the population. In terms of ancestry, 26.0% were German, 17.9% were Irish, 12.4% were English, 10.1% were Italian, 9.0% were Polish, and 6.2% were American.

Of the 28,679 households, 27.2% had children under the age of 18 living with them, 49.2% were married couples living together, 11.4% had a female householder with no husband present, 34.6% were non-families, and 29.9% of all households were made up of individuals. The average household size was 2.32 and the average family size was 2.85. The median age was 43.4 years.

The median income for a household in the county was $38,320 and the median income for a family was $47,214. Males had a median income of $42,022 versus $26,926 for females. The per capita income for the county was $20,266. About 12.1% of families and 15.2% of the population were below the poverty line, including 24.4% of those under age 18 and 9.1% of those age 65 or over.

=== 2000 census ===
As of the 2000 United States census, there were 70,226 people, 28,309 households, and 19,250 families in the county. The population density was 132.0 per square mile (51.0/km^{2}). There were 31,236 housing units at an average density of 58.7 units per square mile (22.7/km^{2}). The racial makeup of the county was 94.98% White, 3.64% Black or African American, 0.14% Native American, 0.30% Asian, 0.02% Pacific Islander, 0.16% from other races, and 0.77% from two or more races. 0.39% of the population were Hispanic or Latino of any race. 20.2% were of German, 12.5% Irish, 12.0% American, 10.3% English, 10.2% Italian and 9.0% Polish ancestry according to the 2000 census.

There were 28,309 households, out of which 28.30% had children under the age of 18 living with them, 53.10% were married couples living together, 11.20% had a female householder with no husband present, and 32.00% were non-families. 28.70% of all households were made up of individuals, and 15.10% had someone living alone who was 65 years of age or older. The average household size was 2.37 and the average family size was 2.90.

The county population contained 21.80% under the age of 18, 7.70% from 18 to 24, 27.40% from 25 to 44, 24.90% from 45 to 64, and 18.20% who were 65 years of age or older. The median age was 41 years. For every 100 females there were 96.40 males. For every 100 females age 18 and over, there were 93.60 males.

The median income for a household in the county was $29,714, and the median income for a family was $37,538. Males had a median income of $31,211 versus $19,890 for females. The per capita income for the county was $16,221. About 11.70% of families and 14.60% of the population were below the poverty line, including 20.40% of those under age 18 and 9.80% of those age 65 or over.

== Politics ==
Belmont County is an Appalachian county in Southern Ohio, and as with many counties in this region was solidly Democratic from the Franklin D. Roosevelt administration through the 1990s. Back in the 19th century, the county frequently voted Republican, including voting for Abraham Lincoln in the 1860 election. Similar to counties in neighboring West Virginia and Kentucky, in Appalachia, the Democratic margins began to shrink in the 2000s, and the county became reliably Republican by 2012.

United States presidential election results for Belmont County, Ohio
Year	Republican		Democratic		Third party(ies)	
Year	No.	%	No.	%	No.	%
1856	1,817	28.48%	2,810	44.04%	1,753	27.48%
1860	2,675	41.00%	1,450	22.22%	2,400	36.78%
1864	3,379	49.10%	3,503	50.90%	0	0.00%
1868	3,893	50.20%	3,862	49.80%	0	0.00%
1872	4,267	53.77%	3,647	45.96%	22	0.28%
1876	4,976	49.56%	5,024	50.03%	41	0.41%
1880	5,539	50.08%	5,379	48.63%	143	1.29%
1884	6,186	50.79%	5,763	47.32%	231	1.90%
1888	6,615	51.55%	5,778	45.02%	440	3.43%
1892	6,329	48.28%	6,123	46.71%	657	5.01%
1896	7,699	53.66%	6,413	44.70%	236	1.64%
1900	8,217	55.33%	6,251	42.09%	384	2.59%
1904	8,170	56.75%	4,801	33.35%	1,425	9.90%
1908	8,193	48.02%	7,750	45.42%	1,120	6.56%
1912	5,267	34.00%	5,412	34.94%	4,812	31.06%
1916	7,526	44.15%	7,911	46.41%	1,609	9.44%
1920	14,761	50.55%	13,347	45.71%	1,093	3.74%
1924	16,378	54.53%	8,074	26.88%	5,583	18.59%
1928	20,969	60.84%	12,807	37.16%	692	2.01%
1932	15,029	40.75%	20,291	55.01%	1,565	4.24%
1936	14,511	31.91%	30,545	67.16%	425	0.93%
1940	17,705	38.22%	28,618	61.78%	0	0.00%
1944	15,485	39.13%	24,093	60.87%	0	0.00%
1948	13,283	35.76%	23,217	62.51%	643	1.73%
1952	17,693	41.68%	24,759	58.32%	0	0.00%
1956	19,230	50.31%	18,991	49.69%	0	0.00%
1960	18,146	43.26%	23,805	56.74%	0	0.00%
1964	9,693	25.59%	28,180	74.41%	0	0.00%
1968	11,512	31.94%	22,056	61.19%	2,478	6.87%
1972	17,628	53.62%	14,800	45.01%	450	1.37%
1976	13,550	38.47%	21,162	60.09%	507	1.44%
1980	13,601	42.47%	16,653	52.00%	1,770	5.53%
1984	15,170	43.52%	19,458	55.82%	228	0.65%
1988	12,214	38.20%	19,515	61.04%	244	0.76%
1992	8,614	25.77%	18,527	55.44%	6,280	18.79%
1996	8,213	26.81%	17,705	57.79%	4,721	15.41%
2000	12,625	41.89%	15,980	53.02%	1,536	5.10%
2004	15,589	46.78%	17,576	52.75%	157	0.47%
2008	15,422	47.40%	16,302	50.10%	812	2.50%
2012	16,758	52.88%	14,156	44.67%	774	2.44%
2016	21,108	67.37%	8,785	28.04%	1,438	4.59%
2020	23,560	71.09%	9,138	27.57%	443	1.34%
2024	22,758	73.30%	8,080	26.02%	211	0.68%

United States Senate election results for Belmont County, Ohio1
Year	Republican		Democratic		Third party(ies)	
Year	No.	%	No.	%	No.	%
2024	20,146	65.51%	9,476	30.82%	1,129	3.67%

== Government ==
Most of the county's government offices are located in the Belmont County Courthouse. Belmont County has a three-member board of county commissioners who administer and oversee the various county departments, similar to all but two of the 88 Ohio counties. The elected commissioners serve staggered four-year terms. As of 2019, Belmont County's elected commissioners are: Jerry Echemann (R), J. P. Dutton (R), and Josh Meyer (R).

=== Corrections ===
Belmont County is served by several detention centers located around St. Clairsville. The Belmont Correctional Institution is located on 158 acres (0.64 km^{2}) between St. Clairsville and Bannock on State Route 331. The facility houses 2,698 inmates as of 2009. The Belmont County Jail in St. Clairsville is located near Belmont College and Ohio University Eastern Campus. The facility contains 144 beds and also houses the county sheriff's offices. The county is also served by Sargus Juvenile Detention Center, a 17-bed facility that also serves surrounding counties. Sargus Center is located next to the county jail.

== Education ==
=== K–12 ===
Belmont County is served by these local schools:

- Barnesville Exempted Village School District
- Bellaire High School
- Belmont County Educational Service Center
- Bridgeport High School
- Buckeye Local High School
- East Richland Christian School
- Harrison Central High School
- Martins Ferry High School
- Olney Friends School
- Saint Clairsville High School
- Shadyside High School
- Union Local High School
- Powhatan Elementary School in Powhatan Point

=== Higher education ===
- Belmont College
- Ohio University Eastern Campus

== Communities ==
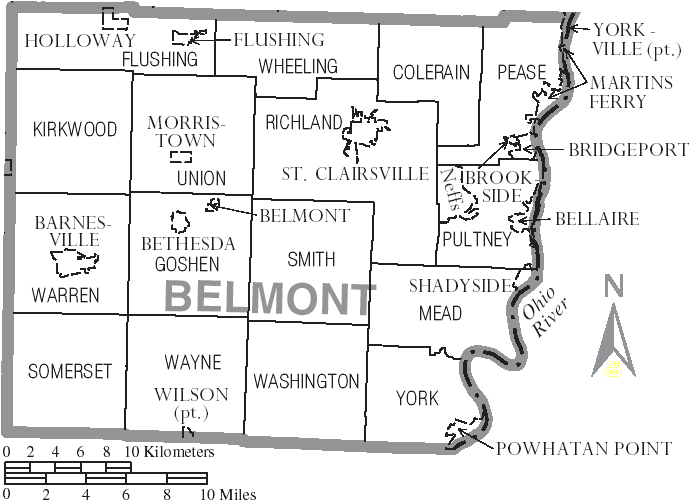
Map of Belmont County, Ohio With Municipal and Township Labels

=== Cities ===
- Martins Ferry
- St. Clairsville (county seat)

=== Villages ===
- Barnesville
- Bellaire
- Belmont
- Bethesda
- Bridgeport
- Brookside
- Fairview
- Flushing
- Holloway
- Morristown
- Powhatan Point
- Shadyside
- Wilson
- Yorkville

=== Census-designated places ===
- Bannock
- Blaine
- Glencoe
- Lafferty
- Lansing
- Lloydsville
- Neffs
- Wolfhurst

=== Unincorporated communities ===
- Alledonia
- Anvil
- Armstrongs Mills
- Badgertown
- Barton
- Boston
- Businessburg
- Captina
- Centerville
- Colerain
- Crescent
- Dilles Bottom
- Egypt
- Fairpoint
- Farmington
- Hendrysburg
- Hunter
- Jacobsburg
- Key
- Lamira
- Maynard
- McClainville
- Pleasant Grove
- Riverview
- Sewellsville
- Somerton
- Steinersville
- Stewartsville
- Tacoma
- Temperanceville
- Uniontown
- Warnock

=== Townships ===
- Colerain
- Flushing
- Goshen
- Kirkwood
- Mead
- Pease
- Pultney
- Richland
- Smith
- Somerset
- Union
- Warren
- Washington
- Wayne
- Wheeling
- York

== Notable people ==
- James E. Boyd (1834–1906), mayor of Omaha and the seventh governor of Nebraska
- William Boyd (1895–1972), film and radio actor, portrayed Western character Hopalong Cassidy from 1935 to 1954
- Don Fleming (1937–1963), a graduate of Shadyside High School, played football for the University of Florida and the Cleveland Browns.
- Joey Galloway (1971), a graduate of Bellaire High School, played football for Ohio State and in the NFL for 15 years.
- John Havlicek (1940–2019), a graduate of Bridgeport High School, played basketball for Ohio State and the Boston Celtics in the NBA. Elected to Hall of Fame.
- Bushrod Johnson (1817–1880), one of the few Confederate States of America generals born in the North, was born in Belmont County.
- Lance Mehl (born 1958), born in Bellaire. NFL football player
- Stan Olejniczak (1912–1979), born in Neffs. NFL football player
- Wilson Shannon (1802–1877), first native-born governor of Ohio
- Drusilla Wilson (1815–1908), temperance leader and Quaker preacher

== See also ==
- National Register of Historic Places listings in Belmont County, Ohio
