= Crescent, Ohio =

Unincorporated community in Ohio, U.S.

Coordinates: 40°07′12″N 80°51′34″W

Crescent is an unincorporated community in Belmont County, in the U.S. state of Ohio.

== History ==
A post office called Crescent was established in 1895, and remained in operation until 1919. Crescent was originally a mining community.
