= Armstrongs Mills, Ohio =

Unincorporated community in Ohio, U.S.

Coordinates: 39°54′29″N 80°56′05″W

Armstrongs Mills is an unincorporated community in Washington Township, Belmont County, in the U.S. state of Ohio.

== History ==
Armstrong's Mills was originally called Captina Creek, and under the latter name was platted in 1816. A post office called Armstrong's Mills was established in 1840, and remained in operation until 1986. The namesake Armstrong's Mills was a gristmill built by Thomas Armstrong in 1828.
