= Captina Island =

Island in the Ohio River in West Virginia, US

- Location in West Virginia

Geography
- Location: Ohio River, West Virginia
- Coordinates: 39°52′32″N 80°47′11″W

Administration
- United States

Captina Island is an island on the Ohio River in Marshall County, West Virginia, United States. Powhatan Point, Ohio is located on the opposite shore from Captina Island. It lies at the southern end of Round Bottom with a stream-like channel separating the island from the West Virginia shore. Captina Island was once the place where watermelons were grown for the Marshall County Fair. It is part of the Ohio River Islands National Wildlife Refuge.

== See also ==
- List of islands of West Virginia
