= Bannock, Ohio =

- Unincorporated community
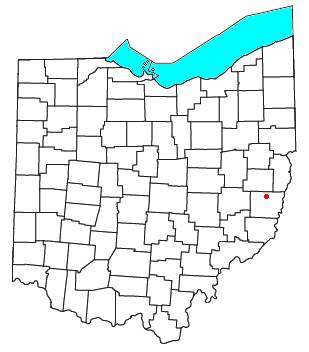
- Location of Bannock, Ohio
- Coordinates: 40°05′55″N 80°58′3″W
- Country: United States
- State: Ohio
- County: Belmont
- Township: Richland
- Elevation: 1,086 ft (331 m)

Population (2020)
  - Total: 159
- Time zone: UTC-5 (Eastern (EST))
  - Summer (DST): UTC-4 (EDT)
- ZIP code: 43972
- Area code: 420
- GNIS feature ID: 2628861

Bannock (/ˈbænɒk/ BAN-ok) is a census-designated place in northwestern Richland Township, Belmont County, Ohio, United States, along Wheeling Creek. As of the 2020 census it had a population of 159. It has a post office with the ZIP code 43972. It lies along State Route 331.

Bannock is part of the Wheeling, WV-OH Metropolitan Statistical Area.

Bannock was originally called Bruce, after Bruce Caldwell, the son of the original owner of the town site. A post office called Bannock has been in operation since 1880. Besides the post office, Bannock had a country store.
