= Warnock, Ohio =

Unincorporated community in Ohio, U.S.

Coordinates: 40°01′21″N 80°56′14″W

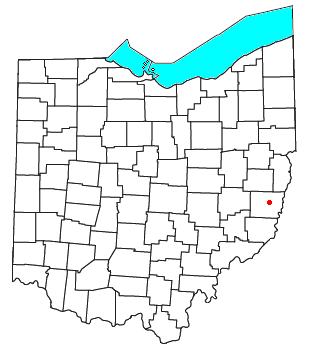
Location of Warnock, Ohio

Warnock is an unincorporated community in northern Smith Township, Belmont County, Ohio, United States. It has a post office with the ZIP code 43967. It lies along State Route 9.

Warnock is part of the Wheeling, WV-OH Metropolitan Statistical Area.

== History ==
A former variant name was Warnocks Station. A post office called Warnock has been in operation since 1857. The community was named for the Warnock family, the original owners of the town site.
