= Richland Township, Belmont County, Ohio =

Township in Ohio, US

- Township
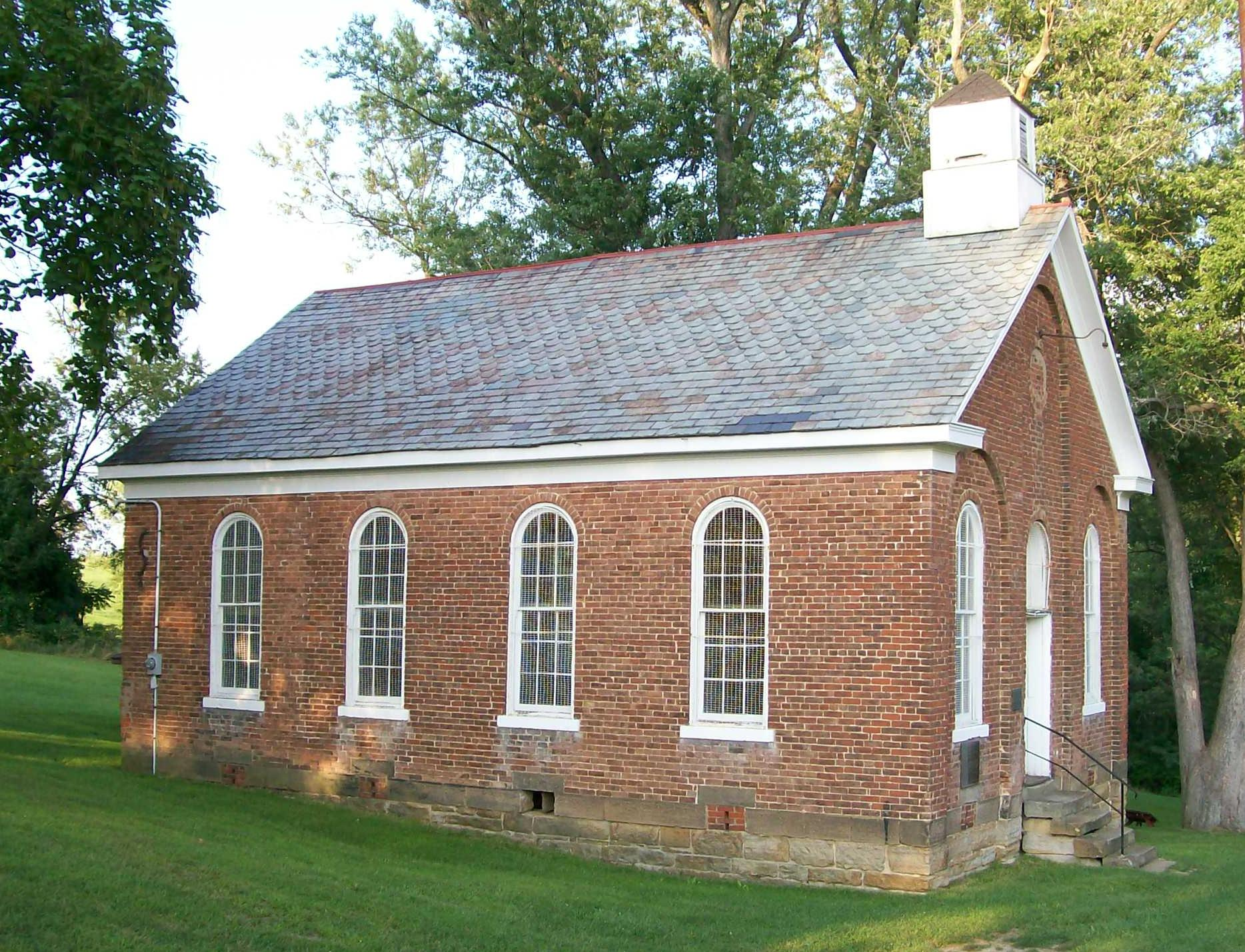
- Great Western Schoolhouse, built 1870

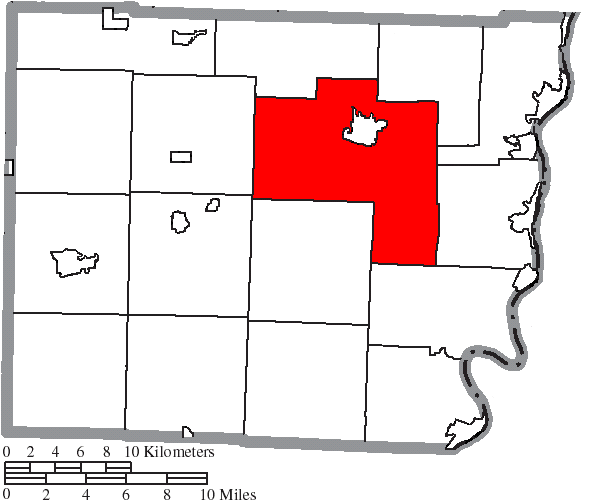
- Location of Richland Township in Belmont County
- Coordinates: 40°3′45″N 80°54′21″W
- Country: United States
- State: Ohio
- County: Belmont

Area
  - Total: 58.8 sq mi (152.2 km^{2})
  - Land: 58.3 sq mi (151.0 km^{2})
  - Water: 0.46 sq mi (1.2 km^{2})
- Elevation: 1,188 ft (362 m)

Population (2020)
  - Total: 14,681
  - Density: 251.8/sq mi (97.23/km^{2})
- Time zone: UTC-5 (Eastern (EST))
  - Summer (DST): UTC-4 (EDT)
- FIPS code: 39-66628
- GNIS feature ID: 1085783
- Website: http://www.richlandtwp.us

Richland Township is one of the sixteen townships of Belmont County, Ohio, United States. The 2020 census found 14,681 people in the township.

== Geography ==
Located in the central part of the county, it borders the following townships:

- Wheeling Township - north
- Colerain Township - northeast
- Pease Township - east, north of Pultney Township
- Pultney Township - east, south of Pease Township
- Mead Township - southeast
- Smith Township - south
- Goshen Township - southwest
- Union Township - west

The city of St. Clairsville is located in central Richland Township, and two unincorporated communities are located in the township: Bannock in the northwest, and Glencoe in the south.

== Name and history ==
Richland Township was established in 1802. The name Richland is descriptive and refers to the fertility of their soil as well as the wealth of coal and limestone within the township's borders.

It is one of twelve Richland Townships statewide.

== Government ==
The township is governed by a three-member board of trustees, who are elected in November of odd-numbered years to a four-year term beginning on the following January 1. Two are elected in the year after the presidential election and one is elected in the year before it. There is also an elected township fiscal officer, who serves a four-year term beginning on April 1 of the year after the election, which is held in November of the year before the presidential election. Vacancies in the fiscal officership or on the board of trustees are filled by the remaining trustees.
