= Glencoe, Ohio =

- Unincorporated community
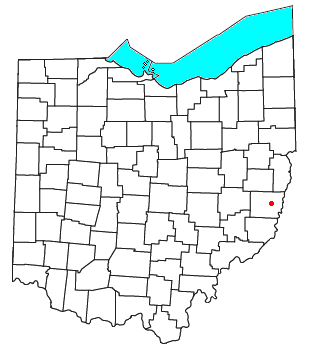
- Location of Glencoe, Ohio
- Coordinates: 40°00′36″N 80°53′37″W
- Country: United States
- State: Ohio
- County: Belmont
- Township: Richland
- Elevation: 1,011 ft (308 m)

Population (2020)
  - Total: 264
- Time zone: UTC-5 (Eastern (EST))
  - Summer (DST): UTC-4 (EDT)
- ZIP code: 43928
- Area code: 740
- GNIS feature ID: 2628895

Glencoe is a census-designated place in southern Richland Township, Belmont County, Ohio, United States. As of the 2020 census it had a population of 264. It has a post office with the ZIP code 43928.

Glencoe is part of the Wheeling, WV-OH Metropolitan Statistical Area.

== History ==
Glencoe was laid out in 1855 when the Baltimore & Ohio Railroad was extended to that point. Some say the community was named after the Coe family, who settled in a nearby glen, while others believe the name is a transfer from Glencoe, Scotland. A post office called Glencoe has been in operation since 1855.
