= Bethesda, Ohio =

- Village
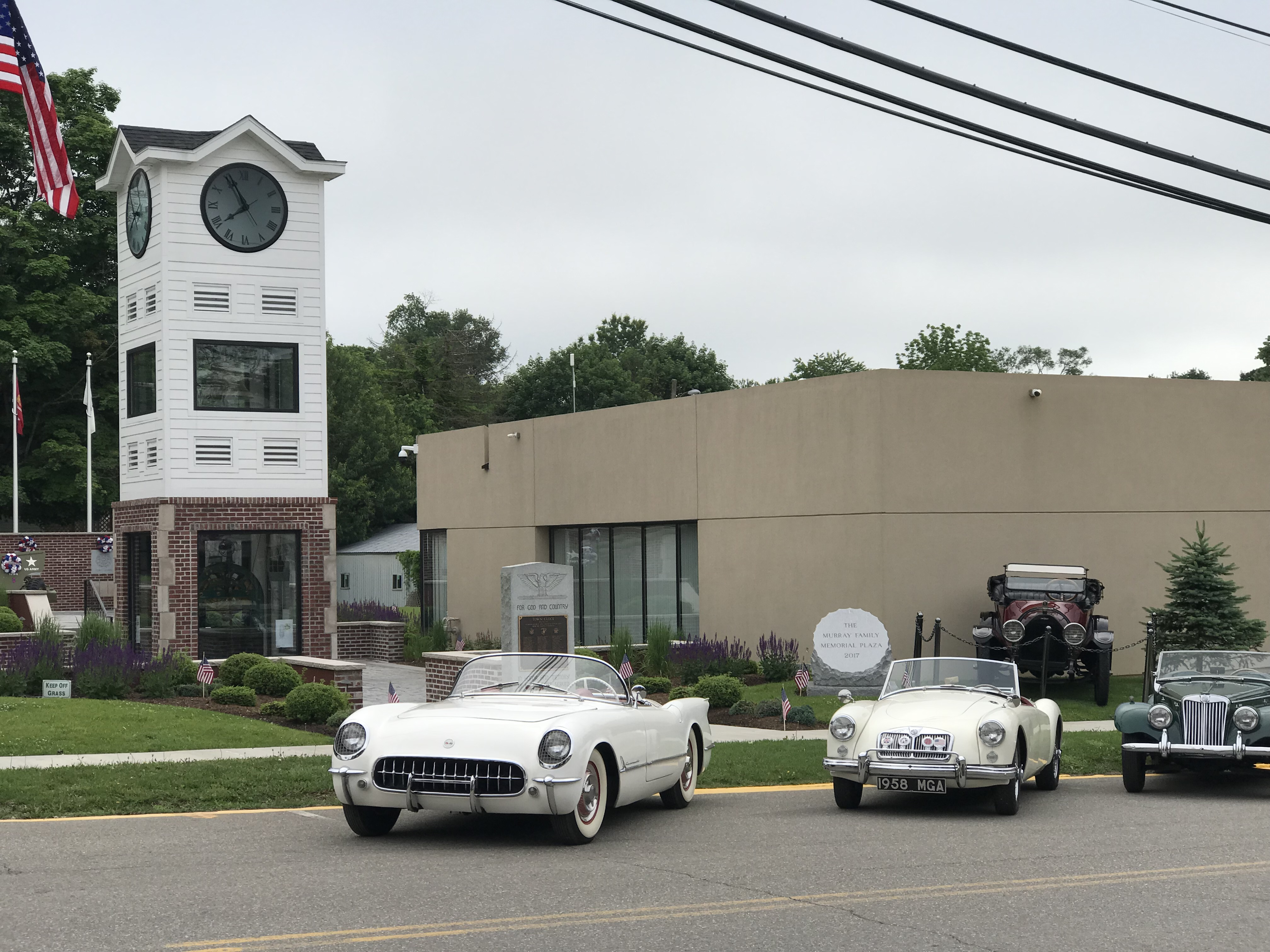
- Municipal Building and Town Clock

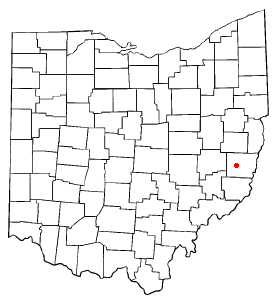
- Location of Bethesda, Ohio

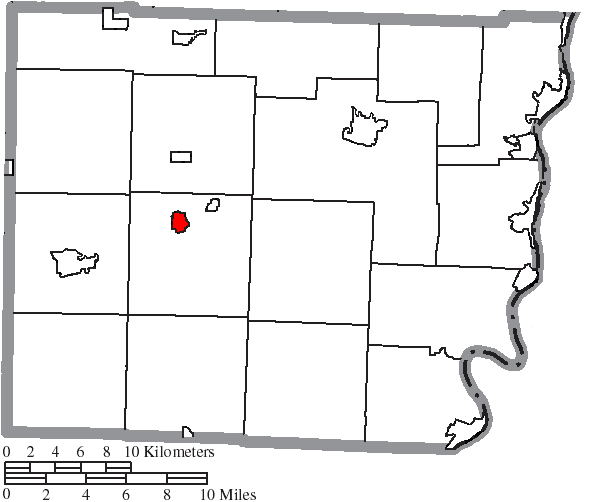
- Location of Bethesda in Belmont County
- Coordinates: 40°00′59″N 81°04′22″W
- Country: United States
- State: Ohio
- County: Belmont
- Township: Goshen
- Established: 1910

Government
  - Mayor: Robert Flannigan

Area
  - Total: 0.64 sq mi (1.67 km^{2})
  - Land: 0.63 sq mi (1.62 km^{2})
  - Water: 0.019 sq mi (0.05 km^{2})
- Elevation: 1,221 ft (372 m)

Population (2020)
  - Total: 1,211
  - Estimate (2023): 1,183
  - Density: 1,941.1/sq mi (749.45/km^{2})
- Time zone: UTC-5 (Eastern (EST))
  - Summer (DST): UTC-4 (EDT)
- ZIP code: 43719
- Area code: 740
- FIPS code: 39-06138
- GNIS feature ID: 2398112
- Website: www.bethesdaohio.org

Bethesda (/bəˈθɛzdə/) is a village in west-central Belmont County, Ohio, United States. The population was 1,211 at the 2020 census. It is part of the Wheeling metropolitan area.

== History ==
Bethesda has had three names: Burrs Mills, Fairmount, and Bethesda. When the railroad reached the village in 1852, the Central Ohio Railroad built a station and named it Burr's Mills in honor of Merrick S. Burr, who operated a sawmill in the area. In 1855, Burr laid out a village which he called Fairmount because of its high and beautiful location. Prior to that time, there was a store, the Bethesda Methodist Church, and a post office, all located about 2 miles south of the current town on what now CR 26, and the post office was named after the church. The store proprietor was the postmaster and when he moved his store to the town, the post office also was relocated but retained its name. As a result, the town was called Fairmount while the railroad station was Burr's Mills and the post office was Bethesda. In the late 1800s, the name of Bethesda was finally chosen for the town. Bethesda was incorporated as a village in 1910.

In 1920, the town contracted with the E. Howard Watch & Clock Company to supply a town clock, which was erected atop the Orrison Cigar Co. building on Main Street and is dedicated to Bethesda's World War I veterans. In 2010, the clock was removed from service and placed in storage. Businessman Robert E. Murray, spearheaded the restoration of the clock and established the Murray Family Memorial Plaza, which was dedicated in 2017. The facility and the restored clock are dedicated to military veterans from all services.

== Geography ==
According to the United States Census Bureau, the village has a total area of 0.64 square miles (1.66 km^{2}), of which 0.62 square miles (1.61 km^{2}) is land and 0.02 square miles (0.05 km^{2}) is water.

== Demographics ==
Historical population
Census	Pop.	Note	%±
1920	1,182		—
1930	1,159		−1.9%
1940	1,127		−2.8%
1950	1,158		2.8%
1960	1,178		1.7%
1970	1,157		−1.8%
1980	1,429		23.5%
1990	1,161		−18.8%
2000	1,413		21.7%
2010	1,256		−11.1%
2020	1,211		−3.6%
2023 (est.)	1,183	▼	−2.3%
U.S. Decennial Census

=== 2010 census ===
As of the census of 2010, there were 1,256 people, 549 households, and 358 families living in the village. The population density was 2,025.8 inhabitants per square mile (782.2/km^{2}). There were 667 housing units at an average density of 1,075.8 per square mile (415.4/km^{2}). The racial makeup of the village was 96.6% White, 0.3% African American, 0.1% Native American, 0.2% Asian, 0.2% Pacific Islander, and 2.7% from two or more races. Hispanic or Latino of any race were 0.2% of the population.

There were 549 households, of which 32.2% had children under the age of 18 living with them, 42.8% were married couples living together, 16.2% had a female householder with no husband present, 6.2% had a male householder with no wife present, and 34.8% were non-families. 29.1% of all households were made up of individuals, and 11.7% had someone living alone who was 65 years of age or older. The average household size was 2.29 and the average family size was 2.80.

The median age in the village was 39.6 years. 24% of residents were under the age of 18; 9.9% were between the ages of 18 and 24; 22.5% were from 25 to 44; 29.8% were from 45 to 64, and 13.6% were 65 years of age or older. The gender makeup of the village was 46.6% male and 53.4% female.

=== 2000 census ===
As of the census of 2000, there were 1,413 people, 592 households, and 397 families living in the village. The population density was 2,199.7 inhabitants per square mile (849.3/km^{2}). There were 679 housing units at an average density of 1,057.1 per square mile (408.1/km^{2}). The racial makeup of the village was 98.94% White, 0.14% African American, 0.28% Native American, 0.21% from other races, and 0.42% from two or more races. Hispanic or Latino of any race were 0.35% of the population.

There were 592 households, out of which 35.1% had children under the age of 18 living with them, 48.3% were married couples living together, 14.0% had a female householder with no husband present, and 32.9% were non-families. 29.9% of all households were made up of individuals, and 14.9% had someone living alone who was 65 years of age or older. The average household size was 2.39 and the average family size was 2.93.

In the village, the population was spread out, with 26.3% under the age of 18, 9.6% from 18 to 24, 29.8% from 25 to 44, 20.5% from 45 to 64, and 13.7% who were 65 years of age or older. The median age was 35 years. For every 100 females, there were 89.9 males. For every 100 females age 18 and over, there were 83.9 males.

The median income for a household in the village was $24,358 and the median income for a family was $31,111. Males had a median income of $27,396 versus $19,028 for females. The per capita income for the village was $13,406. About 16.8% of families and 18.5% of the population were below the poverty line, including 25.0% of those under age 18 and 15.5% of those age 65 or over.

== Education ==
Bethesda has a public library, a branch of the Belmont County District Library.
