= Pultney Township, Belmont County, Ohio =

Township in Ohio, US

- Township
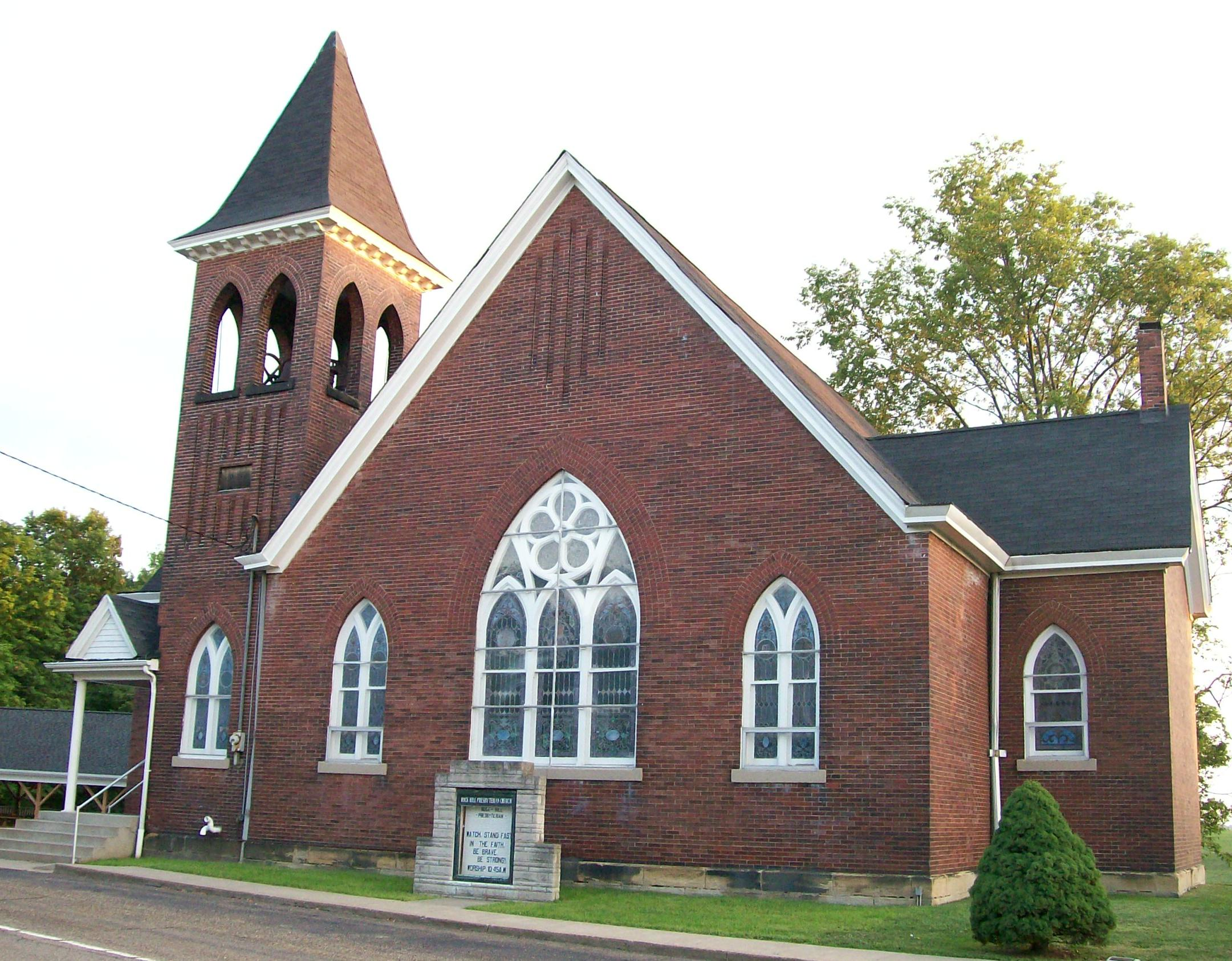
- Rock Hill Presbyterian Church

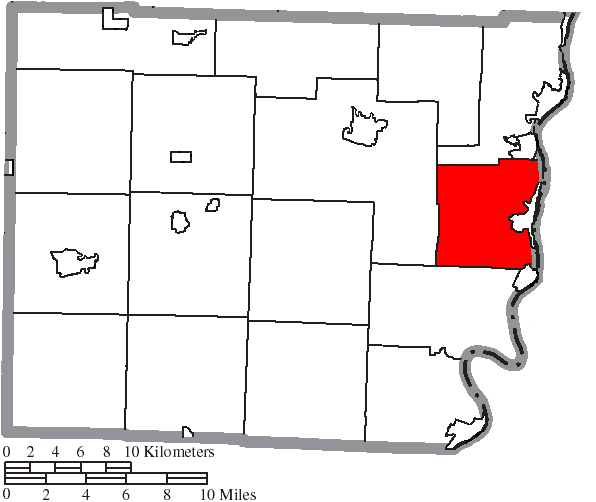
- Location of Pultney Township in Belmont County
- Coordinates: 40°0′58″N 80°45′33″W
- Country: United States
- State: Ohio
- County: Belmont

Area
  - Total: 26.1 sq mi (67.5 km^{2})
  - Land: 25.9 sq mi (67.2 km^{2})
  - Water: 0.12 sq mi (0.3 km^{2})
- Elevation: 810 ft (247 m)

Population (2020)
  - Total: 8,163
  - Density: 315/sq mi (121/km^{2})
- Time zone: UTC-5 (Eastern (EST))
  - Summer (DST): UTC-4 (EDT)
- FIPS code: 39-64962
- GNIS feature ID: 1085782

Pultney Township is one of the sixteen townships of Belmont County, Ohio, United States. The 2020 census found 8,163 people in the township.

== Geography ==
Located in the eastern part of the county along the Ohio River, it borders the following townships:

- Pease Township - north
- Mead Township - south
- Richland Township - west

West Virginia lies across the Ohio River to the east: Ohio County to the northeast, and Marshall County to the southeast.

Several populated places are located in Pultney Township:

- The village of Bellaire in the east, along the Ohio River
- Part of the village of Shadyside in the southeast, along the Ohio River
- The census-designated place of Neffs in the northwest
- The unincorporated community of Blaine in the north
- The unincorporated community of Lansing in the north.

== Name and history ==
Pultney Township was organized in 1801.

It is the only Pultney Township statewide.

In 1833, Pultney Township contained one or two stores, four flouring mills, three or four gristmills, several saw mills, and a woolen factory.

== Government ==
The township is governed by a three-member board of trustees, who are elected in November of odd-numbered years to a four-year term beginning on the following January 1. Two are elected in the year after the presidential election and one is elected in the year before it. There is also an elected township fiscal officer, who serves a four-year term beginning on April 1 of the year after the election, which is held in November of the year before the presidential election. Vacancies in the fiscal officership or on the board of trustees are filled by the remaining trustees.
