= Smith Township, Belmont County, Ohio =

Township in Ohio, US

- Township
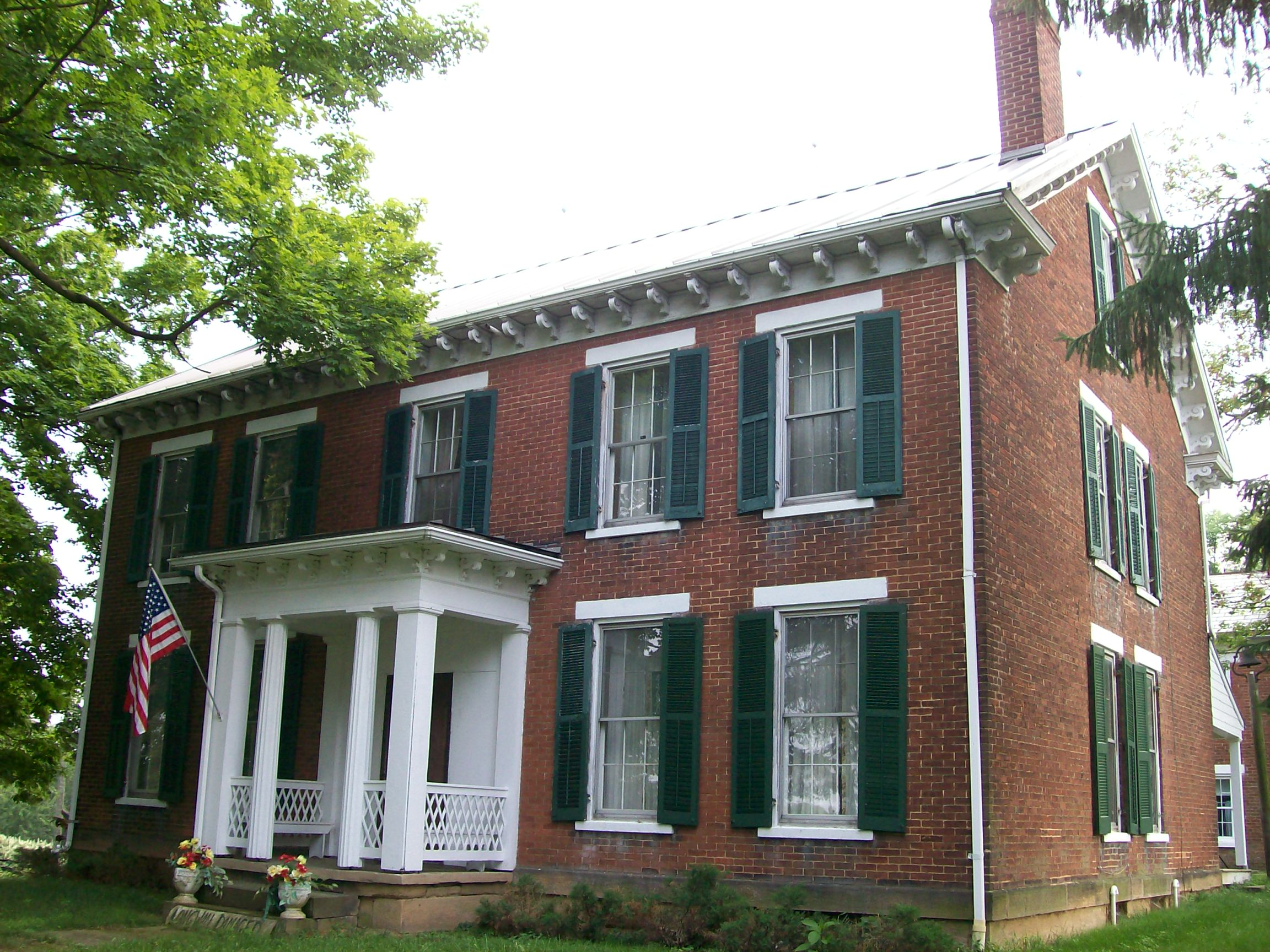
- The James Kinney Farmhouse, built 1863

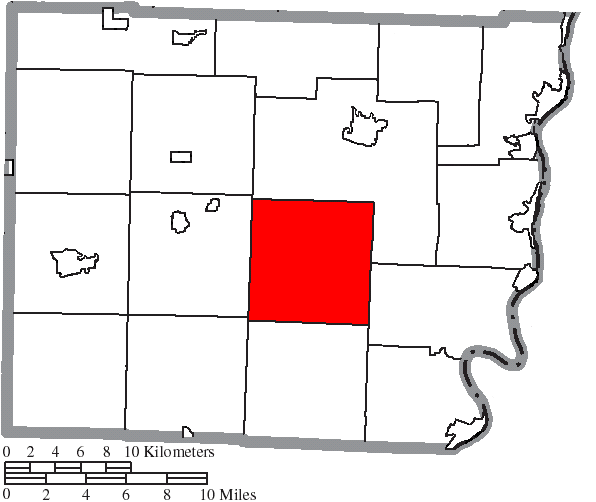
- Location of Smith Township in Belmont County
- Coordinates: 40°0′16″N 80°56′31″W
- Country: United States
- State: Ohio
- County: Belmont

Area
  - Total: 36.2 sq mi (93.8 km^{2})
  - Land: 36.1 sq mi (93.4 km^{2})
  - Water: 0.15 sq mi (0.4 km^{2})
- Elevation: 1,135 ft (346 m)

Population (2020)
  - Total: 1,433
  - Density: 39.7/sq mi (15.3/km^{2})
- Time zone: UTC-5 (Eastern (EST))
  - Summer (DST): UTC-4 (EDT)
- FIPS code: 39-72736
- GNIS feature ID: 1085784

Smith Township is one of the sixteen townships of Belmont County, Ohio, United States. The 2020 census found 1,433 people in the township.

== Geography ==
Located in the central part of the county, it borders the following townships:

- Richland Township - North
- Mead Township - Southeast
- Washington Township - South
- Wayne Township - Southwest
- Goshen Township - West

No municipalities are located in Smith Township, although three unincorporated communities are located in the township: Jacobsburg in the southeast, Centerville in the center, and Warnock in the north.

== Name and history ==
Smith Township was possibly named for William Smith, who built the first gristmill in the township about 1805.

Statewide, the only other Smith Township is located in Mahoning County.

In 1833, Smith Township contained a number of gristmills, saw mills, fulling mills, and carding machines.

== Government ==
The township is governed by a three-member board of trustees, who are elected in November of odd-numbered years to a four-year term beginning on the following January 1. Two are elected in the year after the presidential election and one is elected in the year before it. There is also an elected township fiscal officer, who serves a four-year term beginning on April 1 of the year after the election, which is held in November of the year before the presidential election. Vacancies in the fiscal officership or on the board of trustees are filled by the remaining trustees.
