= Goshen Township, Belmont County, Ohio =

Township in Ohio, US

- Township
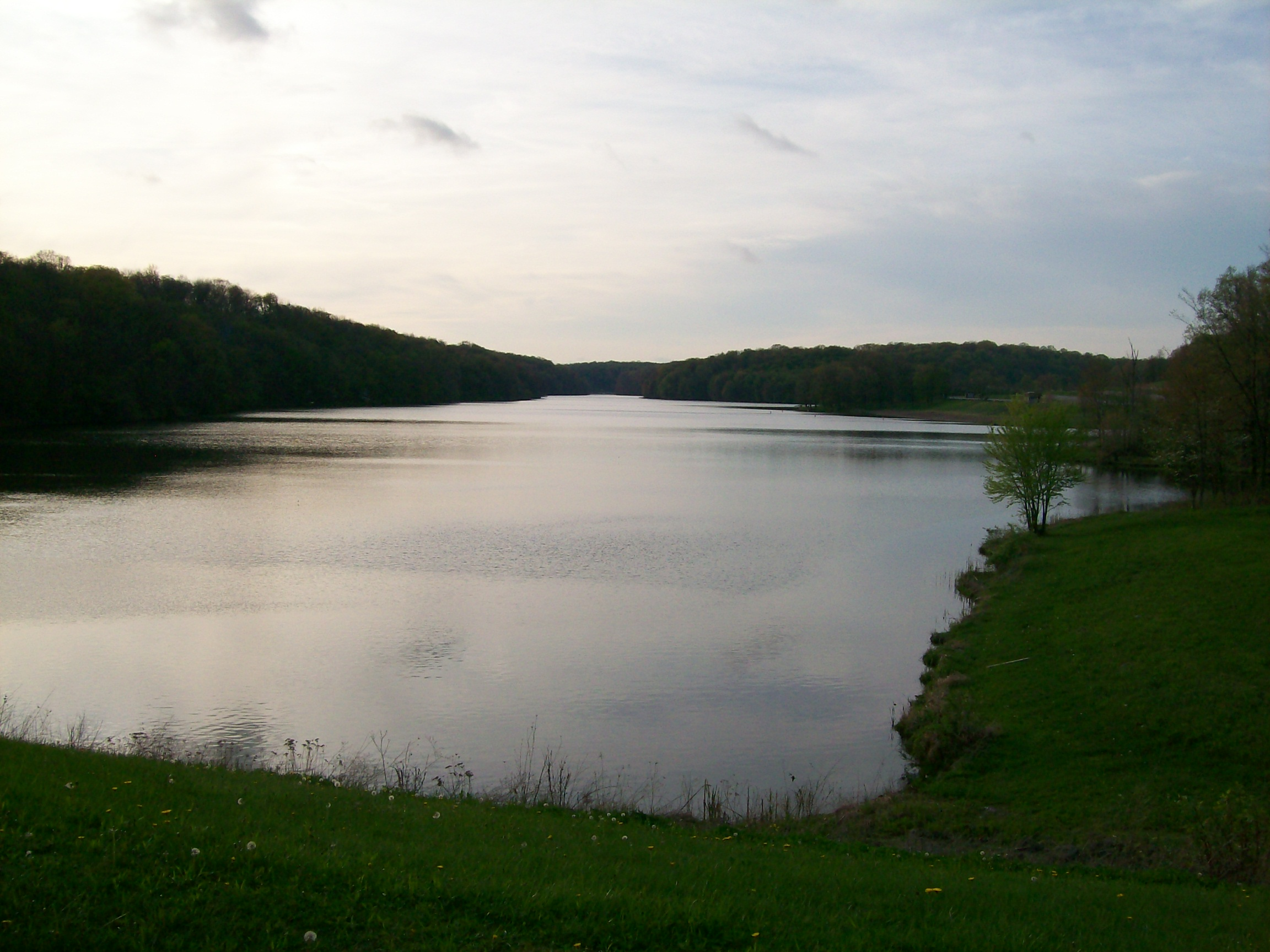
- Dam at Barkcamp State Park

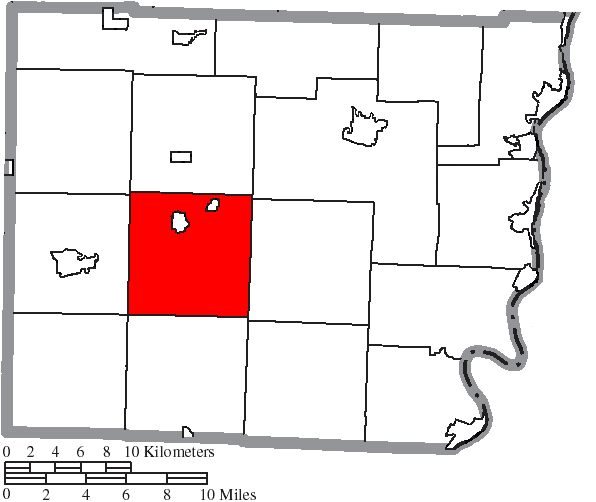
- Location of Goshen Township in Belmont County
- Coordinates: 40°0′30″N 81°3′28″W
- Country: United States
- State: Ohio
- County: Belmont

Area
  - Total: 36.4 sq mi (94.4 km^{2})
  - Land: 36.1 sq mi (93.4 km^{2})
  - Water: 0.39 sq mi (1.0 km^{2})
- Elevation: 1,184 ft (361 m)

Population (2020)
  - Total: 3,027
  - Density: 83.9/sq mi (32.4/km^{2})
- Time zone: UTC-5 (Eastern (EST))
  - Summer (DST): UTC-4 (EDT)
- FIPS code: 39-30968
- GNIS feature ID: 1085778

Goshen Township is one of the sixteen townships of Belmont County, Ohio, United States. The 2020 census reported a population of 3,027 people in the township.

== Geography ==
Located in the central part of the county, it borders the following townships:

- Union Township - north
- Richland Township - northeast
- Smith Township - east
- Wayne Township - south
- Somerset Township - southwest corner
- Warren Township - west
- Kirkwood Township - northwest

Two villages are located in Goshen Township: Belmont in the north, and Bethesda in the center.

== Name and history ==
Goshen Township was settled about 1801 by settlers from Virginia, Pennsylvania and Ireland. These settlers probably named their new township after a Goshen Township in Chester County, Pennsylvania.

Goshen Township was described in 1833 as having several gristmills and saw mills, three or four fulling mills and carding machines.

It is one of seven Goshen Townships statewide.

== Government ==
The township is governed by a three-member board of trustees, who are elected in November of odd-numbered years to a four-year term beginning on the following January 1. Two are elected in the year after the presidential election and one is elected in the year before it. There is also an elected township fiscal officer, who serves a four-year term beginning on April 1 of the year after the election, which is held in November of the year before the presidential election. Vacancies in the fiscal officership or on the board of trustees are filled by the remaining trustees.
