= Belmont, Ohio =

- Village
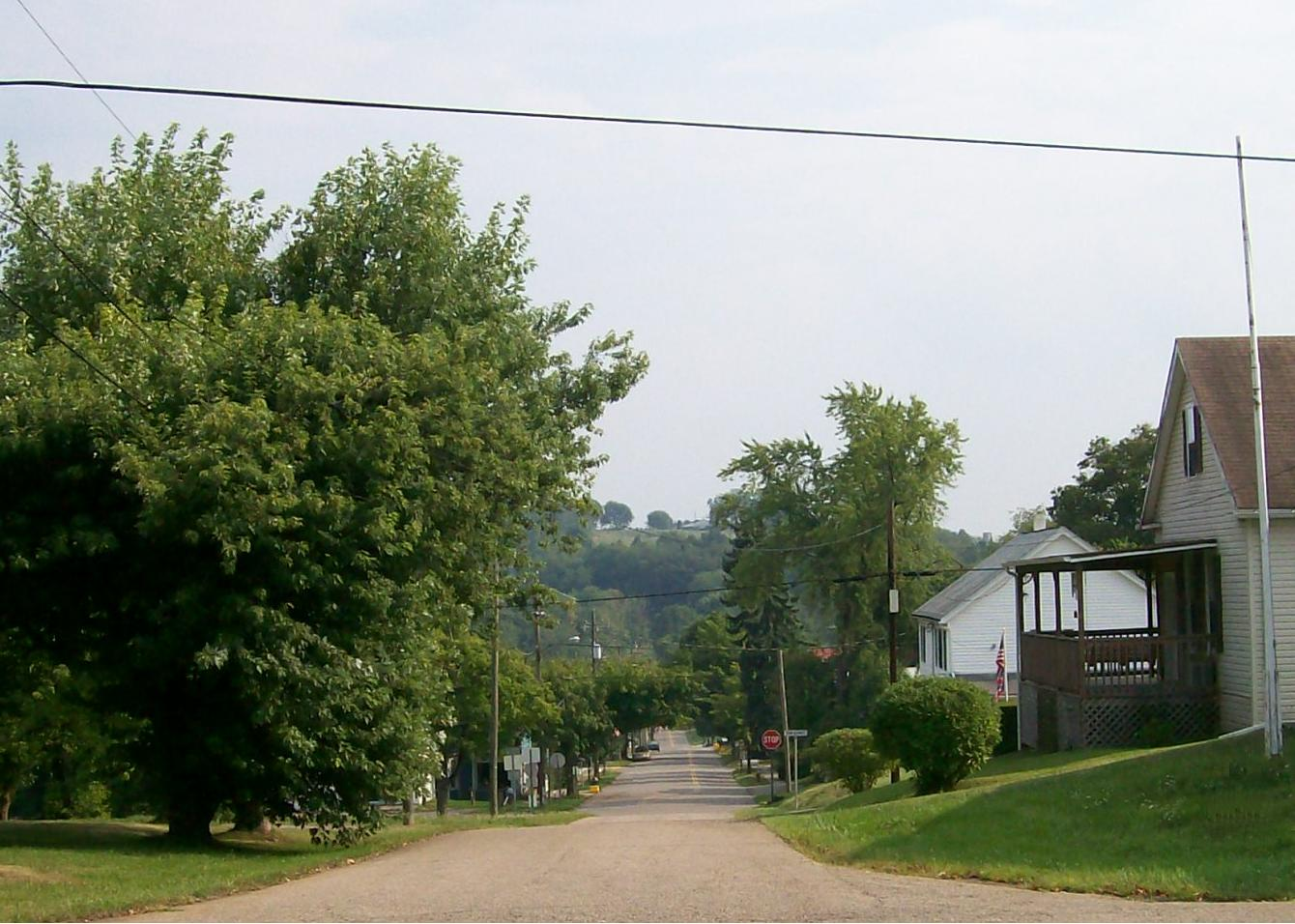
- Belmont Historic District

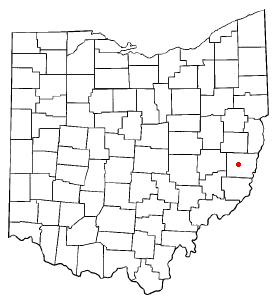
- Location of Belmont, Ohio

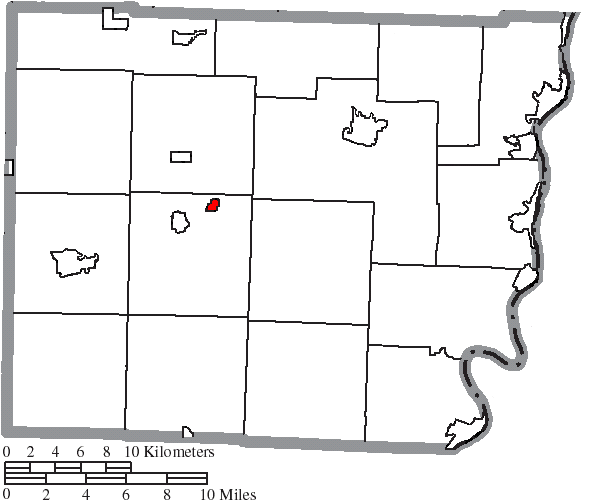
- Location of Belmont in Belmont County
- Coordinates: 40°01′41″N 81°02′27″W
- Country: United States
- State: Ohio
- County: Belmont
- Township: Goshen
- Founded: 1808

Government
  - Mayor: Ron Woods

Area
  - Total: 0.27 sq mi (0.69 km^{2})
  - Land: 0.27 sq mi (0.69 km^{2})
  - Water: 0 sq mi (0.00 km^{2})
- Elevation: 1,188 ft (362 m)

Population (2020)
  - Total: 414
  - Estimate (2023): 404
  - Density: 1,554.8/sq mi (600.33/km^{2})
- Time zone: UTC-5 (Eastern (EST))
  - Summer (DST): UTC-4 (EDT)
- ZIP code: 43718
- Area code: 740
- FIPS code: 39-05312
- GNIS feature ID: 2398086
- Website: villageofbelmont.org

Belmont is a village in central Belmont County, Ohio, United States. The population was 414 at the 2020 census. It is part of the Wheeling metropolitan area.

== History ==
Belmont was originally known as Wrightstown, and under the latter name was laid out in 1808 by Joseph Wright. The name was switched to Belmont in anticipation of being the county seat of Belmont County. St. Clairsville, however, was given the honor of having Belmont County's center of government. The Baltimore and Ohio Railroad cut through the town until its dismantling in the 1980s.

== Geography ==
According to the United States Census Bureau, the village has a total area of 0.27 square miles (0.70 km^{2}), all land.

Belmont is also located approximately one mile south of Barkcamp State Park.

The Village is also part of the historic Drover's Trail that winds through the hills and valleys of Belmont County.

== Demographics ==
Historical population
Census	Pop.	Note	%±
1880	319		—
1890	384		20.4%
1900	422		9.9%
1910	572		35.5%
1920	680		18.9%
1930	674		−0.9%
1940	697		3.4%
1950	638		−8.5%
1960	563		−11.8%
1970	666		18.3%
1980	714		7.2%
1990	471		−34.0%
2000	532		13.0%
2010	453		−14.8%
2020	414		−8.6%
2023 (est.)	404	▼	−2.4%
U.S. Decennial Census

=== 2010 census ===
As of the census of 2010, there were 453 people, 197 households, and 129 families living in the village. The population density was 1,677.8 inhabitants per square mile (647.8/km^{2}). There were 218 housing units at an average density of 807.4 per square mile (311.7/km^{2}). The racial makeup of the village was 97.4% White, 0.4% African American, 1.3% Native American, and 0.9% from two or more races. Hispanic or Latino of any race were 0.2% of the population.

There were 197 households, of which 27.9% had children under the age of 18 living with them, 48.7% were married couples living together, 11.2% had a female householder with no husband present, 5.6% had a male householder with no wife present, and 34.5% were non-families. 31.5% of all households were made up of individuals, and 13.2% had someone living alone who was 65 years of age or older. The average household size was 2.26 and the average family size was 2.77.

The median age in the village was 44 years. 20.8% of residents were under the age of 18; 8.7% were between the ages of 18 and 24; 22.9% were from 25 to 44; 31.7% were from 45 to 64; and 15.9% were 65 years of age or older. The gender makeup of the village was 46.1% male and 53.9% female.

=== 2000 census ===
As of the census of 2000, there were 532 people, 208 households, and 148 families living in the village. The population density was 1,886.6 inhabitants per square mile (728.4/km^{2}). There were 224 housing units at an average density of 794.4 per square mile (306.7/km^{2}). The racial makeup of the village was 96.43% White, 1.13% African American, 0.38% Native American, 0.94% Pacific Islander, and 1.13% from two or more races. Hispanic or Latino of any race were 0.94% of the population.

There were 208 households, out of which 29.3% had children under the age of 18 living with them, 55.3% were married couples living together, 11.5% had a female householder with no husband present, and 28.8% were non-families. 24.5% of all households were made up of individuals, and 10.1% had someone living alone who was 65 years of age or older. The average household size was 2.56 and the average family size was 3.05.

In the village, the population was spread out, with 25.6% under the age of 18, 7.7% from 18 to 24, 27.8% from 25 to 44, 25.2% from 45 to 64, and 13.7% who were 65 years of age or older. The median age was 38 years. For every 100 females there were 99.3 males. For every 100 females age 18 and over, there were 96.0 males.

The median income for a household in the village was $28,875, and the median income for a family was $35,000. Males had a median income of $25,000 versus $19,688 for females. The per capita income for the village was $13,015. About 9.9% of families and 12.0% of the population were below the poverty line, including 12.1% of those under age 18 and 13.2% of those age 65 or over.

== Education ==
Union Local School District.

Faith Community Christian High School. While formerly Belmont Elementary School, it is now home to a private school.

== Notable people ==
- David Clarke, actor
- Nora Dunfee, actor
- Harley Warrick, folk artist and barn painter
