= Wolfhurst, Ohio =

- Census-designated place
- Location within Ohio
- Coordinates: 40°04′08″N 80°46′52″W
- Country: United States
- State: Ohio
- County: Belmont

Area
  - Total: 0.50 sq mi (1.30 km^{2})
  - Land: 0.48 sq mi (1.25 km^{2})
  - Water: 0.015 sq mi (0.04 km^{2})
- Elevation: 676 ft (206 m)

Population (2020)
  - Total: 1,119
  - Density: 2,313.1/sq mi (893.09/km^{2})
- Time zone: UTC-5 (Eastern (EST))
  - Summer (DST): UTC-4 (EDT)
- Area code: 740
- FIPS code: 39-86282
- GNIS feature ID: 2628989

Wolfhurst is a census-designated place (CDP) in Belmont County, Ohio, United States. It is part of the Wheeling, West Virginia Metropolitan Statistical Area. The population was 1,119 at the 2020 census.

== Geography ==
Wolfhurst is located in eastern Belmont County in the valley of Wheeling Creek. It is bordered to the northwest by Lansing, and the village of Brookside is 1 mile (1.6 km) to the east. U.S. Route 40, the National Road, passes through the center of Wolfhurst, leading east 4 miles (6 km) to downtown Wheeling, West Virginia.

According to the United States Census Bureau, the Wolfhurst CDP has a total area of 0.50 square miles (1.30 km^{2}), of which 0.015 square miles (0.04 km^{2}), or 3.38%, is water.

== Demographics ==
Historical population
Census	Pop.	Note	%±
2020	1,119		—
U.S. Decennial Census
