= Phil Niekro =

American baseball player (1939–2020)

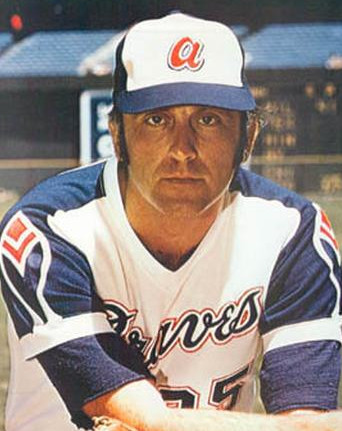
- Niekro with the Atlanta Braves in 1974
- Pitcher
- Born: April 1, 1939; Blaine, Ohio, U.S.
- Died: December 26, 2020 (aged 81); Flowery Branch, Georgia, U.S.
- Batted: Right Threw: Right

MLB debut
- April 15, 1964, for the Milwaukee Braves

Last MLB appearance
- September 27, 1987, for the Atlanta Braves

MLB statistics
- Win–loss record: 318–274
- Earned run average: 3.35
- Strikeouts: 3,342
- Stats at Baseball Reference

Teams
- Milwaukee / Atlanta Braves (1964–1983); New York Yankees (1984–1985); Cleveland Indians (1986–1987); Toronto Blue Jays (1987); Atlanta Braves (1987)

Career highlights and awards
- 5× All-Star (1969, 1975, 1978, 1982, 1984); 5× Gold Glove Award (1978–1980, 1982, 1983); Roberto Clemente Award (1980); 2× NL wins leader (1974, 1979); MLB ERA leader (1967); NL strikeout leader (1977); Pitched a no-hitter on August 5, 1973; Atlanta Braves No. 35 retired; Braves Hall of Fame

Member of the National

Baseball Hall of Fame
- Induction: 1997
- Vote: 80.3% (fifth ballot)

Philip Henry Niekro (/ˈniːkroʊ/ NEE-kroh; April 1, 1939 – December 26, 2020), nicknamed "Knucksie", was an American professional baseball pitcher who played 24 seasons in Major League Baseball (MLB) for the Milwaukee/Atlanta Braves, Cleveland Indians, New York Yankees and Toronto Blue Jays. Niekro is generally regarded as the greatest knuckleball pitcher of all time.

During his career, Niekro was selected to five All-Star teams, led the National League in victories twice (in 1974 and 1979), led the major leagues in earned run average once (in 1967), and won the National League Gold Glove Award five times. As of 13 September 2013, Niekro ranks 16th on MLB's all-time wins list with 318 career victories; as of today , he is the only knuckleballer to win 300 or more major league games. Niekro and his younger brother Joe amassed 539 wins between them; as of 2013, the Niekros had the most combined wins by brothers in baseball history. As of 2023, Niekro also holds the major league record with 121 career victories after the age of 40.

Niekro was inducted into the Baseball Hall of Fame in 1997.

== Early life ==
Niekro was born in Blaine, Ohio, and grew up in Lansing, Ohio, the son of Henrietta (Klinkoski) and Philip Niekro. He was of Polish descent. He attended Bridgeport High School in Bridgeport, Ohio, and was a boyhood friend of Basketball Hall-of-Famer John Havlicek. The baseball field where he played at Bridgeport High School's Perkins Field athletic complex was renamed "The Niekro Diamond" in 2008 after Phil and his brother, fellow major league pitcher Joe Niekro. The brothers were the sons of a coal miner who had pitched semi-pro baseball and learned to throw a knuckleball from another coal miner. He taught the boys the pitch in the backyard. In addition, Phil played American Legion Baseball.

Niekro signed with the Milwaukee Braves in 1959 for $250 (equivalent to $2,761 in 2025). He pitched for several minor league teams at several levels for the next few years, appearing mostly as a relief pitcher. While he was briefly promoted to the Class AAA Louisville Colonels in 1960, he spent the rest of that season pitching for the Jacksonville Braves. He spent the next season with the Class AA Austin Senators. He returned to Louisville in 1962 and had a 9–6 record. He missed the 1963 season due to military service.

== Major league career ==
=== Milwaukee / Atlanta Braves (1964–1983) ===
==== 1964–1969 ====
Niekro debuted with the Milwaukee Braves in 1964, working 15 major league innings and spending time with the team's class AAA minor league affiliate. He stayed with the major league team all year in 1965, pitching 74 2/3 innings in 41 games and recording six saves. In 1966, Niekro split time again between the Braves and their minor league system, going 4–3 with a 4.11 earned run average (ERA).

Niekro led the league with a 1.87 ERA in 1967, earning an 11–9 record with 10 complete games and 9 saves. He began the year as a relief pitcher but had earned a job in the starting rotation during the season.

Before the 1968 season, sportswriter Fred Down described the Braves' pitching staff as "chaotic" and reported that team leadership was planning to use Niekro as both a starter and a reliever in the coming season. He appeared in 37 games, finishing with a 14–12 record and 15 complete games. He appeared in relief three times, earning two saves.

In 1969, his first All-Star season, he had a 23–13 season with a 2.56 ERA, finishing second in the National League Cy Young Award balloting to Tom Seaver. The Braves went to the playoffs, where Niekro was 0–1 with four earned runs allowed in an eight-inning appearance against the New York Mets. Niekro's playoff loss came against Seaver. The team was eliminated from the playoffs after losing the next two games.

==== 1970–1979 ====
In 1970, he went 12–18 with a 4.27 ERA in what turned out to be a down year. He surrendered a league-leading 40 home runs that year, a feat he would not repeat until 1979.

From 1971 to 1973, he combined for a record of 44–36. The Braves finished 3rd, 4th, and 5th in their division. On August 5, 1973, Niekro threw a no-hitter against the San Diego Padres, the first for the Braves since moving to Atlanta.

In 1974, Niekro led the league in several pitching categories, including wins (20), complete games (18), and innings pitched (302.1). He finished third in the voting for the Cy Young Award that year.

From 1975 to 1976, he went 15–15 and 17–11 and made a second All-Star appearance in 1975.

Between 1977 and 1979, Niekro was the league leader in complete games, innings pitched and batters faced. In 1979, the 40-year-old Niekro led the league in both wins (21) and losses (20). He finished sixth in Cy Young Award voting in both 1978 and 1979, and made his third All-Star appearance in 1978, as well as winning three consecutive Gold Glove Awards from 1978 to 1980.

Phil and Joe Niekro were NL co-leaders in wins in 1979; the two brothers each earned 21 wins that year. As of 2013, he remains the last MLB pitcher to win and lose 20 games in the same season. The 1979 season was Niekro's third and final 20-win season and his second and final 20-loss season.

==== 1980–1983 ====
In 1980 and 1981, he went 15–18 and 7–7 while leading the league in games started (38) and losses (18) in 1980.

In 1982, at the age of 43, Niekro led the Braves with a 17–4 season while winning his fourth Gold Glove Award and appearing in his fourth All-Star game. On October 1, with the Braves clinging to a one-game lead over the Los Angeles Dodgers, Niekro beat the San Diego Padres almost single-handedly by throwing a complete game shutout and hitting a two-run home run. Niekro started Game One of the subsequent 1982 National League Championship Series against the St. Louis Cardinals and pitched well, but the game was called on account of rain just before it became official. He pitched six innings of Game 2 and left with a 3–2 lead. However, the Cardinals scored two late runs after Niekro left the game and would eventually sweep the series.

In 1983, he went 11–10 and won his fifth Gold Glove Award. After the season, the Braves released him.

=== New York Yankees (1984–1985) ===
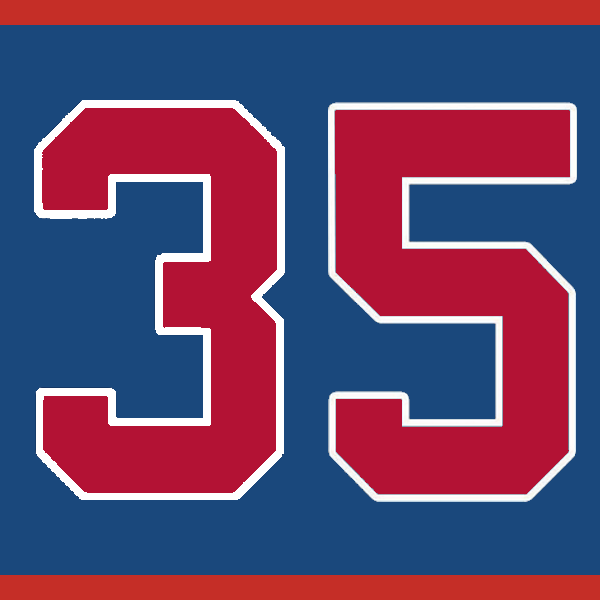
Phil Niekro's number 35 was retired by the Atlanta Braves in 1984.

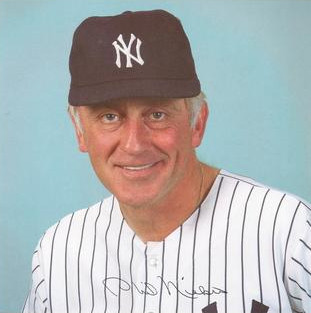
Niekro in 1984.

In 1984, Niekro signed a two-year contract with the New York Yankees. He won 16 games in 1984 and made his fifth and final All-Star appearance.

On October 6, 1985, Niekro earned his 300th career win with a shutout win over the Toronto Blue Jays. At 46 years, 188 days, Niekro became the oldest pitcher to pitch a shutout in the major leagues. This record stood for nearly 25 years before Jamie Moyer (47 years, 170 days) bested the feat in May 2010. He did not throw his trademark knuckleball throughout the game until the final hitter; to former AL MVP Jeff Burroughs. Niekro struck Burroughs out to end the game, which would also be Burroughs' final regular season appearance. He finished the 1985 season with a 16–12 record, the final time he won 15 or more games in a single season. He was released by the Yankees before the 1986 season started.

=== Cleveland Indians (1986–1987) ===
After two seasons in New York, Niekro pitched for the Cleveland Indians in 1986. He went 11–11 with a 4.32 ERA. He started the 1987 season with the Indians, going 7–11 in 26 starts.

=== Toronto Blue Jays (1987) ===
On August 9, 1987, Niekro was traded to the Toronto Blue Jays for Darryl Landrum and a player to be named later, who was later revealed to be Don Gordon. After going 0–2 in three starts, the Blue Jays released Niekro.

=== Second stint with the Atlanta Braves (1987) ===
On September 23, 1987, Niekro signed again with his old team, the Atlanta Braves. On September 27, he made his final start of his career, pitching three innings and surrendering five runs in the no-decision. The Braves lost the game against the San Francisco Giants 15–6. Niekro retired at the end of the season.

At the age of 48, Niekro was the oldest player in major league history to play regularly until Julio Franco played at age 49 in 2007. He set a major league record by playing 24 seasons in the major leagues without a World Series appearance. His total of 5,404 1/3 innings pitched is the most by any pitcher in the post-1920 live-ball era.

=== Pitching repertoire ===
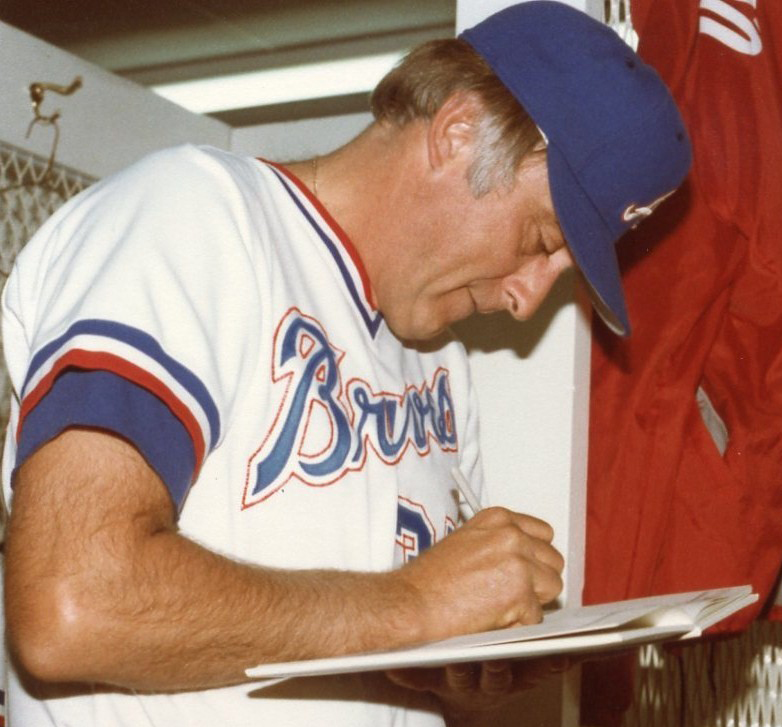
Niekro signing an autograph in 1982

A sidearm pitcher, his pitching featured the knuckleball, which frustrated major league hitters. Ralph Kiner compared Niekro's special pitch to "watching Mario Andretti park a car". Pete Rose said, "I work for three weeks to get my swing down pat and Phil messes it up in one night... Trying to hit that thing is a miserable way to make a living." Catcher Bob Uecker was also frustrated by the pitch at times, saying, "Niekro struck out a hitter once and I never touched the ball. It hit me in the shinguard, bounced out to Clete Boyer at third base and he threw out the runner at first. Talk about a weird assist: 2–5–3 on a strikeout." Uecker also said humorously of the pitch, "The way to catch a knuckleball is to wait until it stops rolling and pick it up."

=== Hall of Fame induction ===
Niekro was elected to the Hall of Fame in 1997, his fifth year of eligibility. He was the only player elected that year; Tony Pérez and Don Sutton were among the notable eligible players who were not elected that year. After he was notified, Niekro said, "Giving a description of today's phone call is impossible. I've been stunned before. I just didn't prepare myself this year. I was not going to get myself so high." The year before, Niekro had received the most Hall of Fame votes out of all the players in the ballot, but had not received the required 75% of the vote for election.

=== Career statistics ===
W	L	PCT	ERA	G	GS	CG	SHO	SV	IP	H	ER	R	HR	BB	SO	WP	HBP
318	274	.537	3.35	864	716	245	45	29	5404.0	5044	2012	2337	482	1809	3342	226	123

== Later endeavors ==
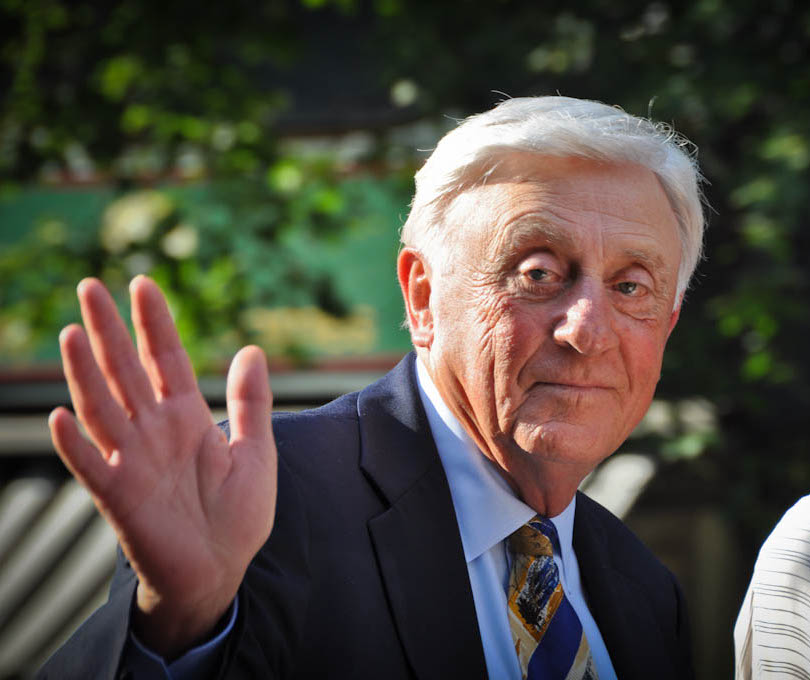
Niekro in 2013

After the end of his professional baseball career, Niekro managed the all-women Colorado Silver Bullets baseball team. Niekro taught his nephew Lance Niekro to throw a knuckleball after Lance's unsuccessful stints as a power-hitting first base prospect with the San Francisco Giants.

Niekro was a member of the board of directors for Kiz Toys, a toy company based out of Cumming, Georgia, and Niekro advised the company on the KizSport baseball line, reviewing product designs and development.

The Gwinnett Stripers—the AAA affiliate of the Atlanta Braves—play their home games at Coolray Field. Coolray Field has a restaurant, Niekro's, that is named after Niekro. It features the Knucksie Sandwich, made with barbecue pork and cole slaw atop a corn muffin; it was said to be Niekro's favorite sandwich. Niekro and his family supported the students of Bridgeport High School with the proceeds from an annual golf tournament called "The Niekro Classic".

== Personal life and death ==
Niekro and his wife, Nancy, had three sons: Philip, John, and Michael.

On December 26, 2020, Niekro died in his sleep at age 81. He had been diagnosed with prostate cancer and had battled the disease for some time.

== See also ==
- Major League Baseball titles leaders
- List of Major League Baseball career wins leaders
- List of Major League Baseball annual ERA leaders
- List of Major League Baseball annual strikeout leaders
- List of Major League Baseball annual wins leaders
- List of Major League Baseball career hit batsmen leaders
- List of Major League Baseball career strikeout leaders
- List of Major League Baseball no-hitters
- List of Major League Baseball single-inning strikeout leaders

Preceded by Jim Bibby	No-hitter pitcher August 5, 1973	Succeeded by Steve Busby
