= Ohio State Route 331 =

State highway in eastern Ohio, US

State Route 331

Route information
- Maintained by ODOT
- Length: 18.48 mi (29.74 km)
- Existed: 1932–present

Major junctions
- West end: US 22 near Holloway
- I-70 near Saint Clairsville
- East end: US 40 near Saint Clairsville

Location
- Country: United States
- State: Ohio
- Counties: Harrison, Belmont

Highway system
- Ohio State Highway System; Interstate; US; State; Scenic
← SR 330	→ SR 332

State Route 331 (SR 331, OH 331) is an east–west state highway in the eastern portion of the U.S. state of Ohio. State Route 331 has its western terminus at U.S. Route 22 approximately 4 miles (6.4 km) northwest of the village of Holloway. Its eastern terminus is at a signalized intersection with U.S. Route 40 nearly 2.75 miles (4.43 km) west of Saint Clairsville, and immediately south of Exit 213 off of Interstate 70.

== Route description ==
Along its way, State Route 331 passes through portions of Harrison and Belmont Counties. There are no stretches of State Route 331 that are incorporated within the National Highway System, a system of highways determined to be most important for the country's economy, mobility and defense.

== History ==
State Route 331 made its debut in 1932. Originally, the highway ran from its current western terminus at U.S. Route 22 northwest of Holloway to its current western junction with State Route 149 in Flushing. In 1939, State Route 331 took on the shape that it has today when it was extended southeasterly from Flushing to its current eastern terminus at U.S. Route 40 west of Saint Clairsville.

== Major intersections ==
County	Location	mi	km	Destinations	Notes
Harrison	Moorefield Township	0.00	0.00	US 22 – Cambridge, Cadiz	
Belmont	Flushing	8.96	14.42	SR 149 south (Morristown Street) – Belmont, Barkcamp State Park	Western end of SR 149 concurrency
Belmont	Flushing Township	10.66	17.16	SR 149 north (Flushing New Athens Road) – Cadiz	Eastern end of SR 149 concurrency
Belmont	Richland Township	18.07	29.08	I-70 east – Wheeling	Exit 213 (I-70); access to I-70 eastbound and from I-70 westbound only
Belmont	Richland Township	18.21	29.31	US 40 to I-70 west / CR 82 (Airport Road) – St. Clairsville, Columbus	
1.000 mi = 1.609 km; 1.000 km = 0.621 mi: Concurrency terminus; Incomplete access
