= Wheeling Creek (Ohio) =

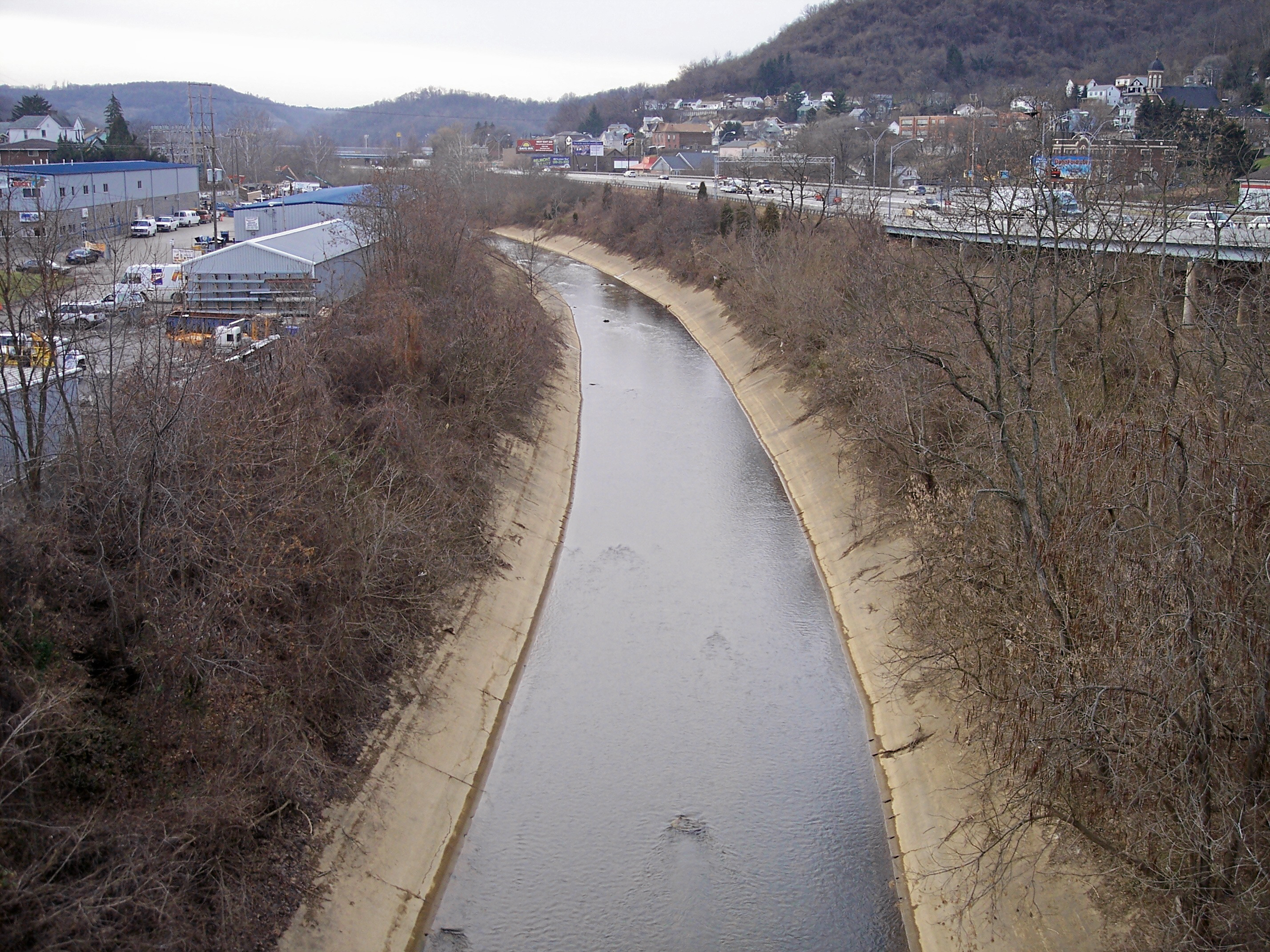
- Wheeling Creek near its mouth in Bridgeport in 2006

- Location of the mouth of Wheeling Creek in Bridgeport, Ohio

Location
- Country: United States
- State: Ohio

Physical characteristics
- Source
  - location: East of Flushing
  - coordinates: 40°08′57″N 81°03′00″W
  - elevation: 1,242 ft (379 m)
- Mouth: Ohio River
  - location: Bridgeport
  - coordinates: 40°04′17″N 80°44′17″W
  - elevation: 623 ft (190 m)
- Length: 30.2 mi (48.6 km)
- Basin size: 108 mi^{2} (280 km^{2})
- Discharge
  - location: mouth
  - average: 123.46 cu ft/s (3.496 m^{3}/s) (estimate)

Wheeling Creek is a tributary of the Ohio River, 30.2 miles (48.6 km) long, in eastern Ohio in the United States. Via the Ohio River, it is part of the watershed of the Mississippi River, draining an area of 108 square miles (280 km^{2}) on the unglaciated portion of the Allegheny Plateau. It flows for its entire length in Belmont County; its tributaries also drain small areas of south-eastern Harrison County and south-western Jefferson County.

Wheeling Creek rises in Flushing Township just east of the community of Flushing, and flows generally east through Union, Wheeling, Richland, Colerain, and Pease Townships, past the communities of Lafferty, Bannock, Fairpoint, Maynard, Barton, Blaine, Lansing, and Brookside, to Bridgeport, where it flows into the Ohio River from the west, just upstream of the mouth of West Virginia's Wheeling Creek on the opposite bank. The National Road (U.S. Route 40) parallels the stream between Bridgeport and Blaine.

== Flow rate ==
At its mouth, the estimated mean annual flow volume of Wheeling Creek is 123.46 cubic feet per second (3.496 m^{3}/s). The United States Geological Survey operates a stream gauge on the creek downstream of Blaine, 4.8 miles (7.7 km) upstream of the creek's mouth. Between 1984 and 2005, the annual mean flow of the creek at the gauge was 115 cubic feet per second (3.3 m^{3}/s). The creek's highest flow during the period was 8,500 cu ft/s (240 m^{3}/s) on September 17, 2004. The lowest recorded flow was 7 cu ft/s (0.20 m^{3}/s) on September 21, 1985.

== Variant names ==
According to the Geographic Names Information System, Wheeling Creek has also been known historically as:

- Indian Wheeling Creek
- Scalp Creek
- Spit Head Creek
- Spithead Creek

== See also ==
- List of rivers of Ohio
- Blaine Hill "S" Bridge
