= Maynard, Ohio =

Unincorporated community in Ohio, U.S.

Coordinates: 40°07′24″N 80°52′45″W

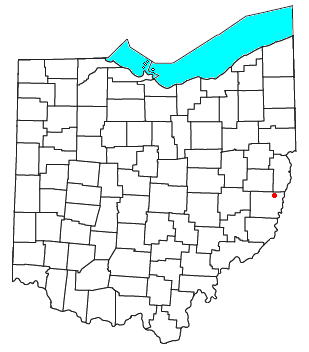
Location of Maynard, Ohio

Maynard is an unincorporated community located in western Colerain Township, Belmont County, Ohio, United States, along Wheeling Creek. It has a post office with the ZIP code 43937.

Maynard is part of the Wheeling, WV-OH Metropolitan Statistical Area. Maynard is a part of the St. Clairsville-Richland City School District.

The community is near Wheeling Township and its sister community of Blainesville.

== Name origin ==
Maynard was named for Postmaster General Horace Maynard, who would serve under President Rutherford B. Hayes when the community would apply for its post office in 1880. While serving as a Representative from Tennessee, Maynard had visited the county seat St. Clairsville stumping on behalf of President Andrew Johnson and his policies while on the Swing Around the Circle campaign nearly fifteen years before the Post Office's naming.

Until its postal application, the rail stop was called Henderson's Station after the Henderson family. Undoubtedly, Maynard would have been named Henderson if the name had not already been in use. A short-lived mail stop on the St. Clairsville-Cadiz Pike (today State Route 9) in Belmont County near the border with Harrison County was named Henderson in 1877 after its postmaster. Stockdale was proposed as a name for the community, but upon the recent news of Horace Maynard's appointment to President Hayes' cabinet, the current name was selected.

== History ==
The Maynard area saw initial development as Henderson's Station as a stop on the Cleveland, Tuscarawas Valley & Wheeling Railway. Purchased by the Cleveland, Lorain and Wheeling Railway in 1875, the line was still frequently referred to as the Tuscarawas Valley (T.V.) line. Maynard saw substantial growth as coal works were mined, commencing around the time its post office was established through the 1920s. Railroad executive and coal mine owner Selah Chamberlain purchased land and developed a grouping of 77 company houses on a hill above Maynard, which would be called New Pittsburgh in 1883. In 1916, statistics show Maynard to have 1,588 adults and 259 children members at St. Stanislaus Catholic Church alone.

== Notable person ==
- Robert H. Allison, Illinois state legislator and lawyer
