= Wheeling Creek =

Wheeling Creek may refer to the following watercourses in the United States:

- Wheeling Creek (Ohio)
- Wheeling Creek (West Virginia)
