= Pease Township, Belmont County, Ohio =

Township in Ohio, US

- Township
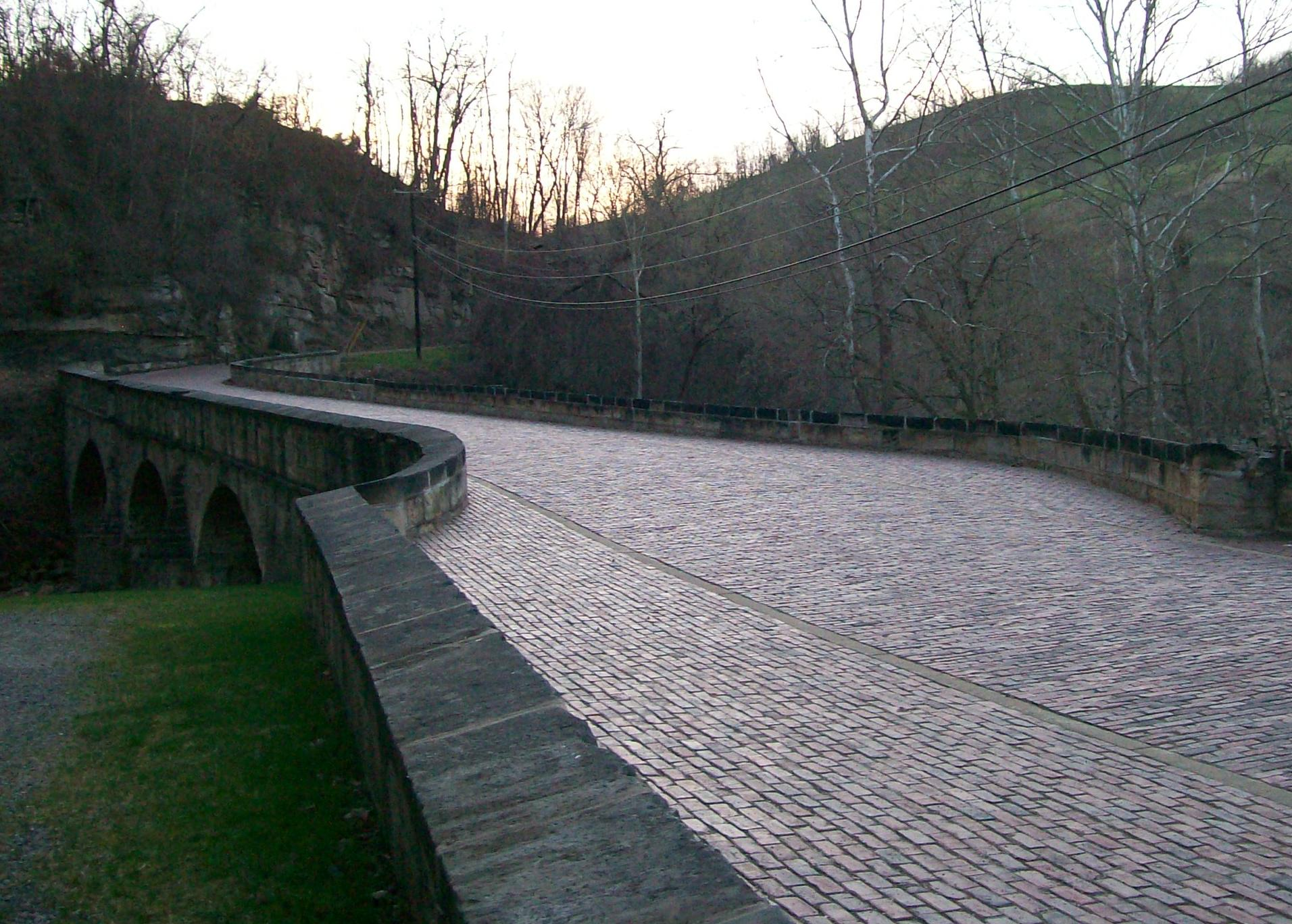
- Overview of the Blaine Hill "S" Bridge on the original National Road route

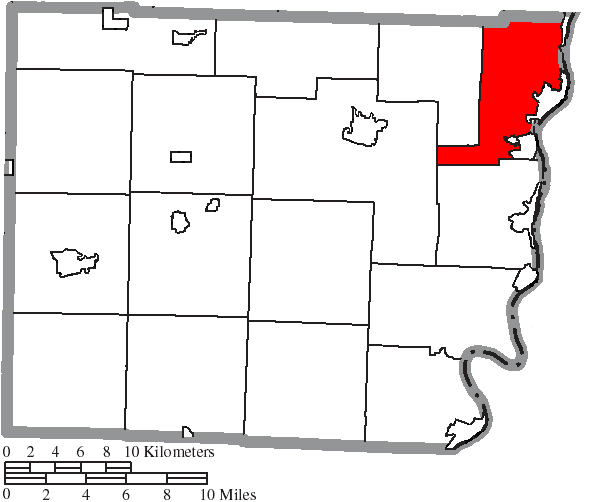
- Location of Pease Township in Belmont County
- Coordinates: 40°5′35″N 80°44′42″W
- Country: United States
- State: Ohio
- County: Belmont

Area
  - Total: 28.7 sq mi (74.3 km^{2})
  - Land: 28.5 sq mi (73.9 km^{2})
  - Water: 0.12 sq mi (0.3 km^{2})
- Elevation: 1,286 ft (392 m)

Population (2020)
  - Total: 12,849
  - Density: 450/sq mi (174/km^{2})
- Time zone: UTC-5 (Eastern (EST))
  - Summer (DST): UTC-4 (EDT)
- FIPS code: 39-61378
- GNIS feature ID: 1085781

Pease Township is one of sixteen townships of Belmont County, Ohio, United States. The 2020 census counted 12,849 people living in the township.

== Geography ==
Located in the northeastern corner of the county along the Ohio River, it borders the following townships:

- Warren Township, Jefferson County—north
- Pultney Township—south
- Richland Township—southwest
- Colerain Township—west
- Mount Pleasant Township, Jefferson County—northwest

Ohio County, West Virginia, lies across the Ohio River to the east.

Several municipalities are located in Pease Township:

- The village of Bridgeport in the southeast, along the Ohio River
- The village of Brookside in the south
- The city of Martins Ferry in the east, along the Ohio River
- The village of Yorkville in the northeast, along the Ohio River

The unincorporated community of Riverview lies in the township's southeast, and the unincorporated census-designated places of Lansing and Wolfhurst are in the township's southwest, while Blaine lies in the township's west.

== Name and history ==
Pease Township was organized in 1806. Pease is the name of an early judge.

It is the only Pease Township statewide.

In 1833, Pease Township contained four flouring mills, one woolen and one cotton factory, and a number of gristmills and saw mills.

== Government ==
The township is governed by a three-member board of trustees, who are elected in November of odd-numbered years to a four-year term beginning on the following January 1. Two are elected in the year after the presidential election and one is elected in the year before it. There is also an elected township fiscal officer, who serves a four-year term beginning on April 1 of the year after the election, which is held in November of the year before the presidential election. Vacancies in the fiscal officership or on the board of trustees are filled by the remaining trustees.
