= Ohio Bicentennial =

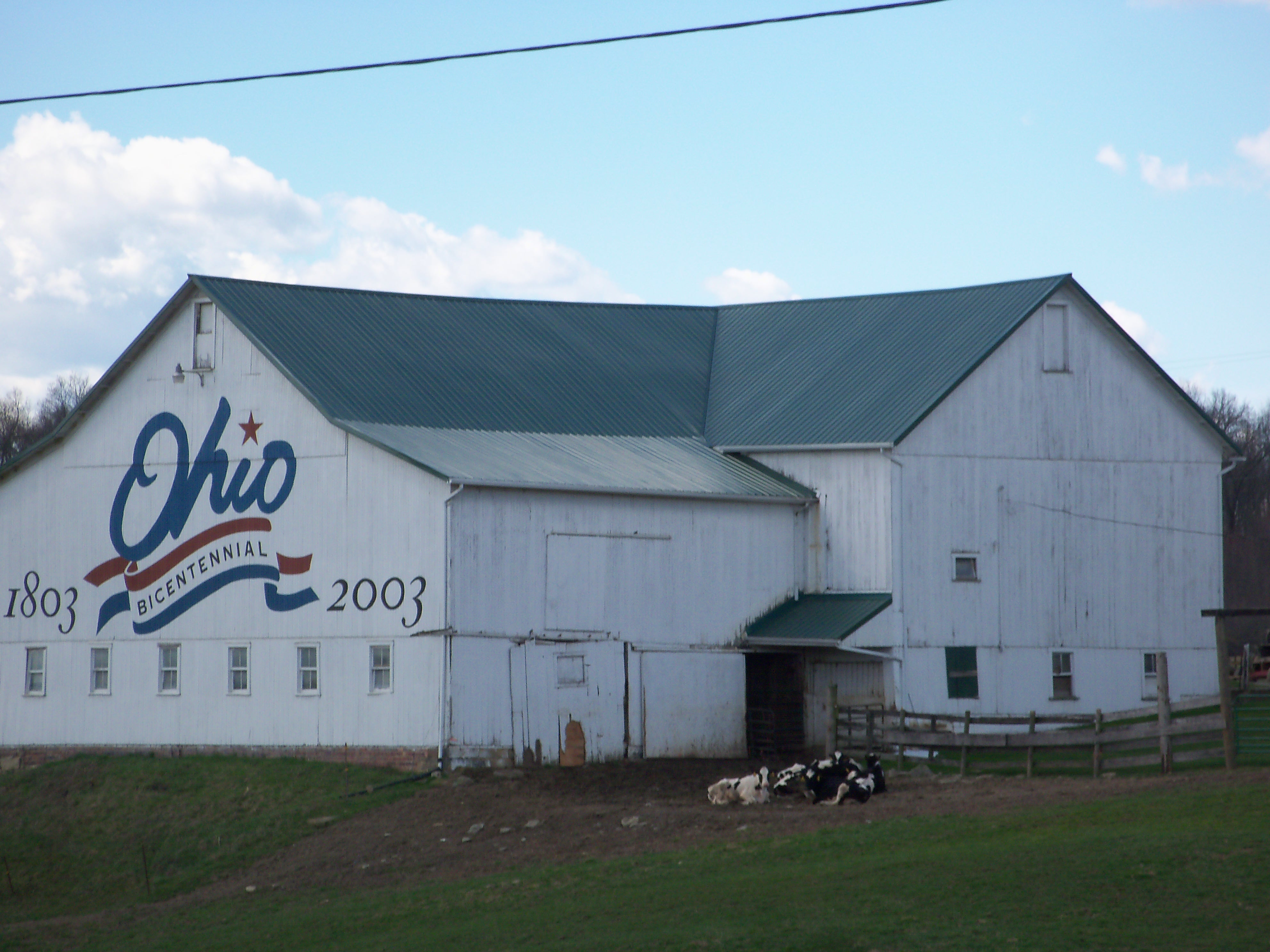
The Carroll County bicentennial barn

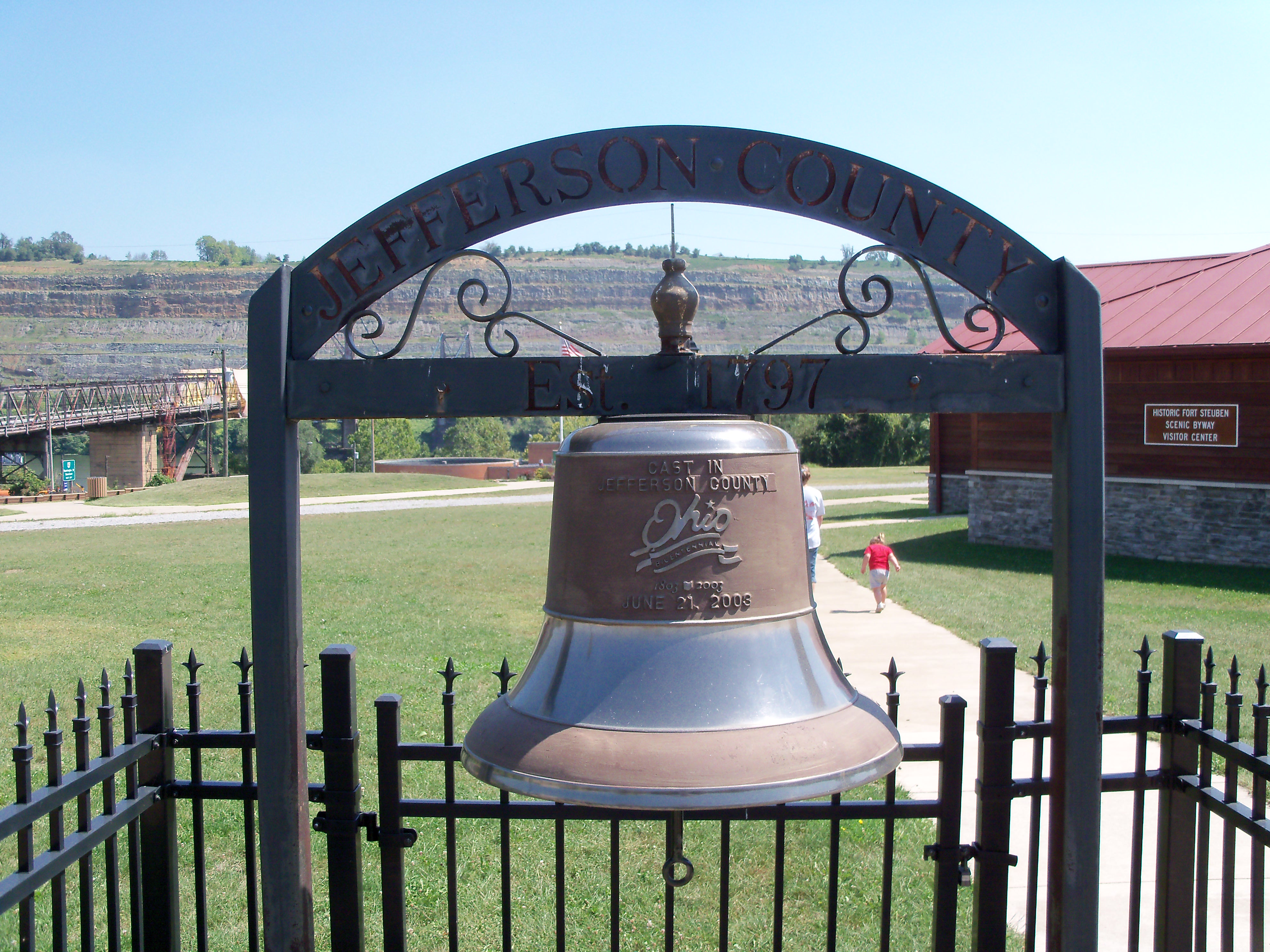
The Jefferson County bicentennial bell

The Ohio Bicentennial was a series of events and programs held in the U.S. state of Ohio to coincide with the 200th anniversary of statehood on March 1, 2003. The Ohio Bicentennial Commission was established by the Ohio General Assembly in 1995 to sponsor commemorative barn paintings, bells, and historical markers throughout the state in the years leading up to the celebration. Other state and federal agencies also marked the anniversary with special events and designations.

== Statewide commemorations ==
From 1997 to September 2002, the Committee commissioned Scott Hagan of Belmont County to paint a barn in each county with the committee's logo and colors. Nearly 2,000 barn owners volunteered their barns to be painted. In the end, Hagan painted 101 barns freehand, including one in each county. One was destroyed by a tornado shortly after its painting and was replaced. The barn painting program was conceived as a cost-effective way to advertise: each barn cost $1,500 to paint, about $500 less than the rent for a billboard. The painted barns celebrated the state's 200th anniversary in 2003. By 2013, many of the painted barns had faded or been repainted or torn down. Hagan went on to paint barn advertisements across the country. (The barn painting program is not to be confused with the Ohio Department of Agriculture's Bicentennial Farm program.)

The Commission also commissioned The Verdin Company of Cincinnati to cast a bronze bell on site, out in the open, in each county throughout the bicentennial year. Each 250-pound (110 kg) bell took two days to cast using a mobile foundry.

During the summer of 2003, a wagon train traveled across the state on the historic National Road from Martins Ferry to the Indiana state line at New Paris.

== License plate ==
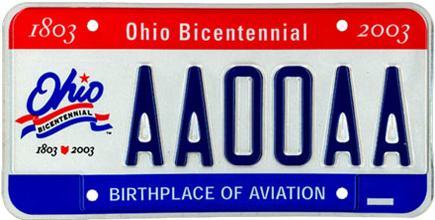
The Ohio Bicentennial license plate

The Ohio Bureau of Motor Vehicles also issued a radical redesign of the state’s license plate that bore the Commission's logo to the left, the words "1803 Ohio Bicentennial 2003" across the top, and a new six-digit numbering scheme. Previously, commemorative license plates had been issued for the state's sesquicentennial in 1953 and for the Northwest Territory's sesquicentennial in 1938.

== Other commemorations ==
- In 2002, the United States Mint released 632,032,000 quarters commemorating Ohio's bicentennial as part of its 50 State Quarters program.
- In 2003, the Ohio Historical Society restored the Adena Mansion, originally the home of Thomas Worthington.
- In 2000, the Commission sponsored a sculpture, Hammy Birthday Ohio, as part of Cincinnati's Big Pig Gig event. The sides of the pig-shaped sculpture depict a bicentennial barn on one side and a cornfield on the other. After the event concluded, the sculpture was moved to the Earth's Harvest Agricultural Garden at the Ohio Governor's Mansion.
- The Blaine Hill "S" Bridge in Blaine, the oldest standing bridge in the state, was designated the "Ohio Bicentennial Bridge".

== Further reading and viewing ==
- Wilkinson, Christina (January 1, 2003). Bicentennial Barns of Ohio: A Tribute to the Barns and Their Owners. Rosewood Press. ISBN 0-9742020-0-2. A history of the bicentennial barns licensed by the Bicentennial Commission.
- Opening the Door West (television production). Reedsville, Ohio: Shelburne Films. 2003.
