= Flushing Township =

Flushing Township may refer to:

- Flushing Township, Michigan
- Flushing Township, Belmont County, Ohio
