= Thomas T. and Wesley B. Frasier Houses =

Historic house in Ohio, United States

- Frasier, Thomas T. and Wesley B. Houses
- U.S. National Register of Historic Places
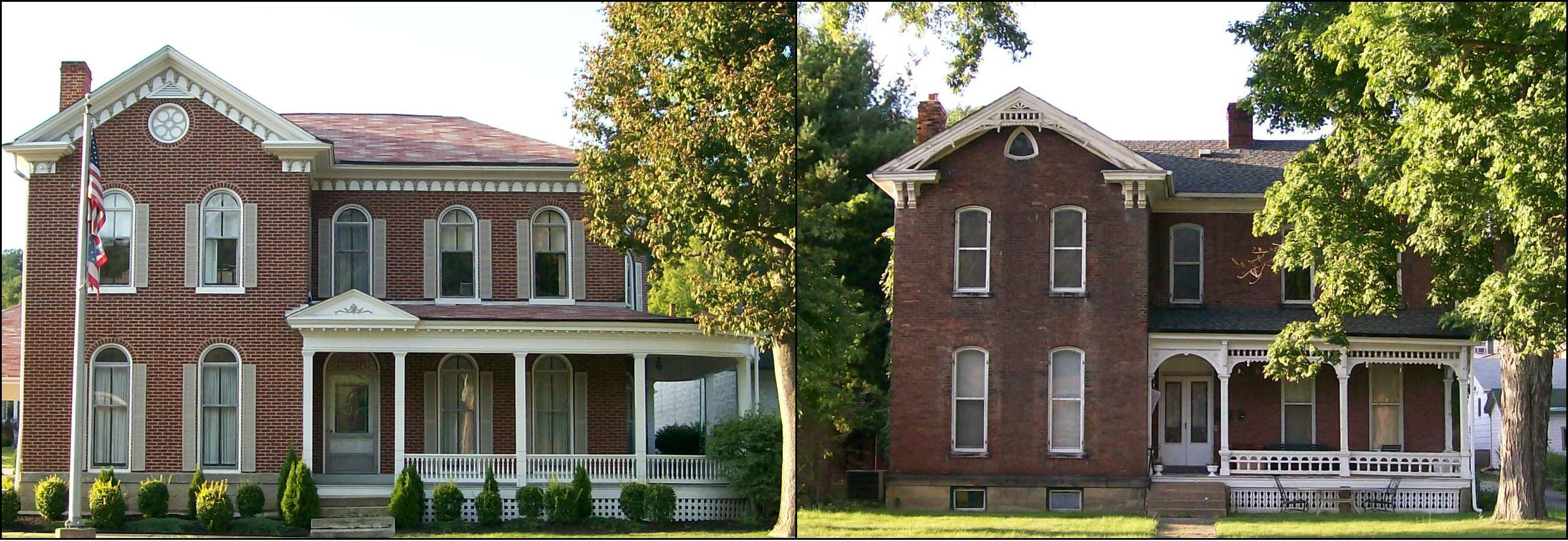
- The Frasier Houses at 920 (left) and 828 (right) National Road in Bridgeport, Ohio

- Location within Ohio Location within the United States
- Location: 898 and 920 National Rd., Brookside, Ohio
- Coordinates: 40°4′15″N 80°45′35″W
- Area: less than one acre
- Architect: Frasier, Thomas Townsend
- NRHP reference No.: 82001359
- Added to NRHP: November 17, 1982

The Thomas T and Wesley B Frasier Houses in Brookside, Ohio were built in the 19th century along Route 40. The houses were added to the National Register on 1982-11-17.

The house located at 920 National Road is currently used as Wilson Funeral Home, owned and operated by U.S. Congressman Charlie Wilson, while the house at 898 National Road is used as the private residence of Ohio State Senator Jason Wilson.
