= Fairpoint, Ohio =

Unincorporated community in Ohio, U.S.

Coordinates: 40°07′13″N 80°55′58″W

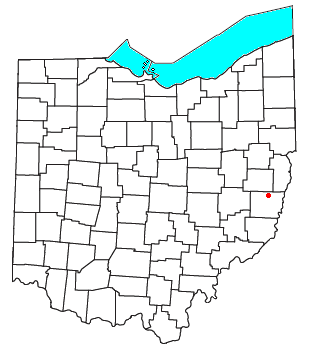
Location of Fairpoint, Ohio

Fairpoint is an unincorporated community in eastern Wheeling Township, Belmont County, Ohio, United States, along Wheeling Creek. Although it is unincorporated, and at one point had a post office which was closed in recent years, with the ZIP code 43927. It lies along State Route 9.

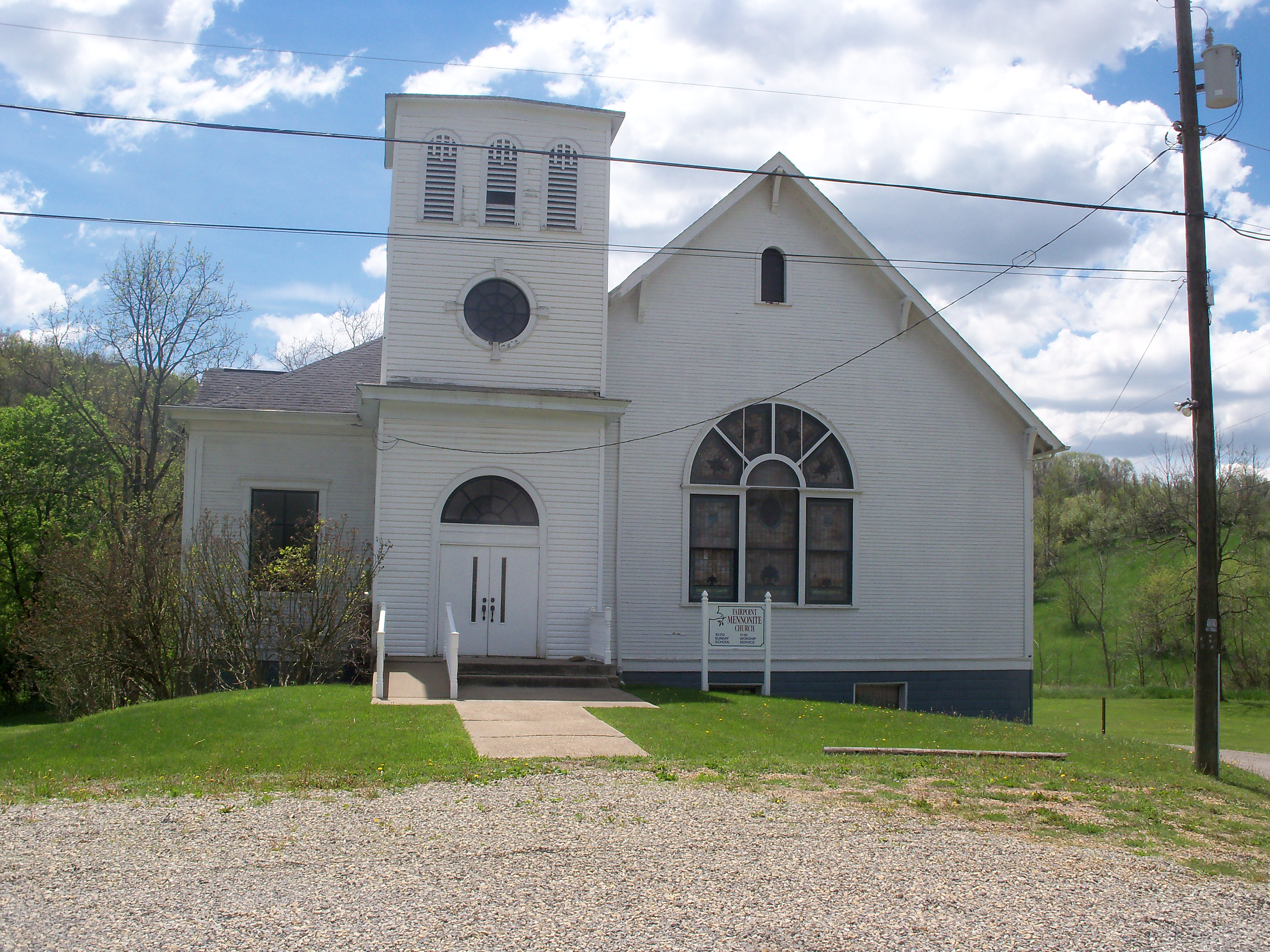
Fairpoint Mennonite Church

Fairpoint is part of the Wheeling, WV-OH Metropolitan Statistical Area.

== History ==
The name Fairpoint is commendatory. A post office called Fairport was established in 1876. Besides the post office Fairpoint had a few country stores.
