= Skeeter Scalzi =

American baseball player

- Shortstop
- Born: June 16, 1913; Lafferty, Ohio, U.S.
- Died: August 25, 1984 (aged 71); Pittsburgh, Pennsylvania, U.S.
- Batted: Right Threw: Right

MLB debut
- July 21, 1939, for the New York Giants

Last MLB appearance
- September 25, 1939, for the New York Giants

MLB statistics
- Batting average: .333
- Home runs: 0
- Runs batted in: 0
- Stats at Baseball Reference

Teams
- New York Giants (1939)

Frank John "Skeeter" Scalzi (June 16, 1913 – August 25, 1984) was an American professional baseball player and manager. A 5-foot, 6 inch (1.68 m), 160-pound (72.6 kg) shortstop and third baseman, Scalzi threw and batted right-handed.

Born in Lafferty, Ohio, Scalzi attended the University of Alabama where his roommate was the future longtime Alabama Crimson Tide head football coach Paul "Bear" Bryant. His 17-year baseball playing career, which began in 1936, was almost exclusively spent in the minor leagues. The exception was an 11-game, 18-at bat trial with the 1939 New York Giants of Major League Baseball. Scalzi collected six hits, all singles, for a batting average of .333, with one stolen base. He started four games at shortstop during his stint with the Giants.

Scalzi became a minor-league manager in 1947, and worked in that role for 12 years in several organizations, most notably the Chicago White Sox farm system, through 1960.

Skeeter Scalzi died in Pittsburgh, Pennsylvania at the age of 71. He was interred at Upland Cemetery, Yorkville, Ohio.
