= Blaine Hill "S" Bridge =

- U.S. National Register of Historic Places
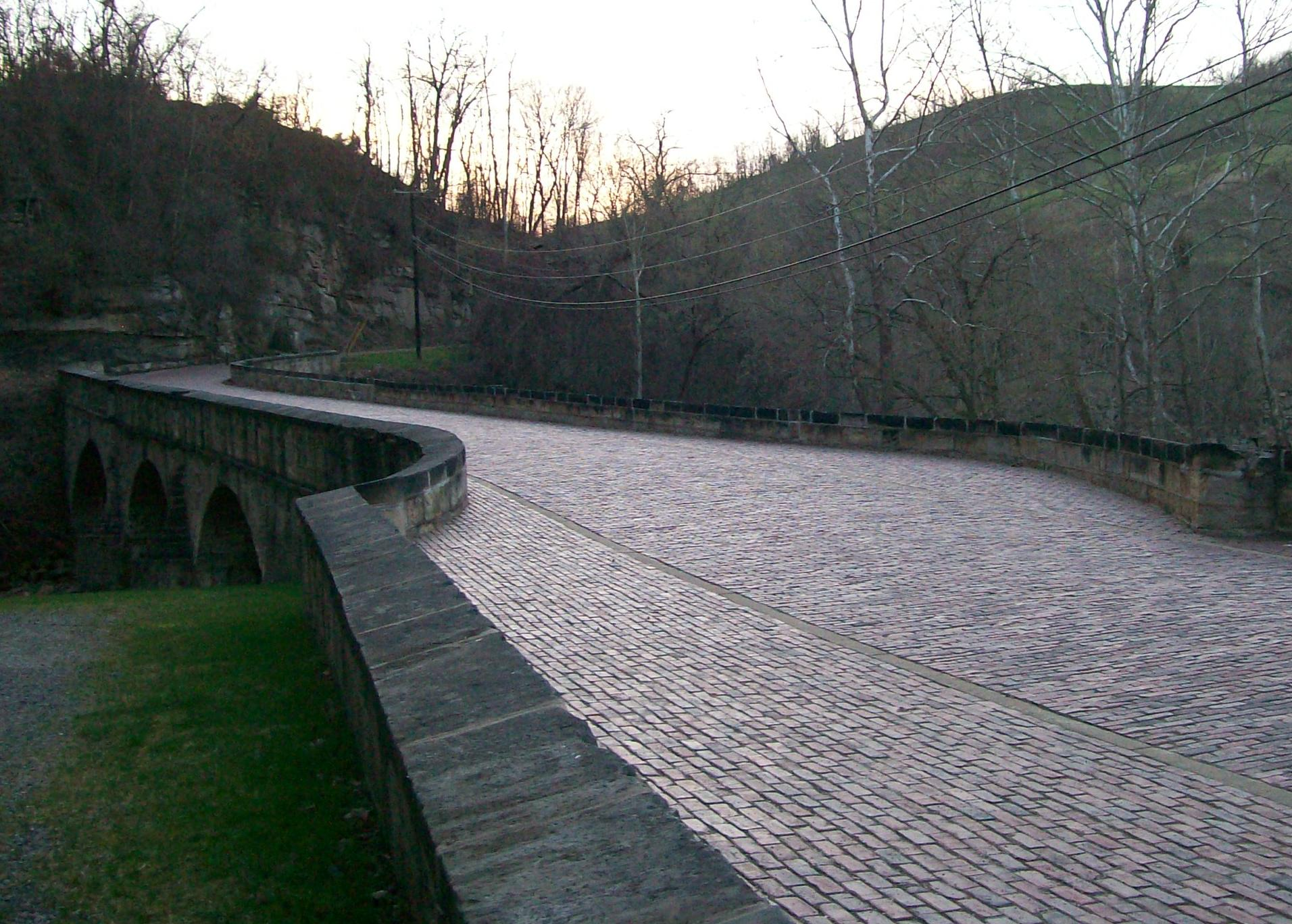
- The Blaine S Bridge in 2010.

- Location within Ohio Location within the United States
- Location: Township Road 649 at Blaine, Ohio
- Coordinates: 40°4′0.92″N 80°49′15.49″W
- Built: 1828
- NRHP reference No.: 10000082
- Added to NRHP: March 17, 2010

The Blaine Hill "S" Bridge is located over Wheeling Creek at the western boundaries of Blaine in Belmont County, Ohio, United States. The bridge was designated the Ohio Bicentennial Bridge in 2003, and was placed on the National Register of Historic Places on March 17, 2010.

Built in 1826, the Blaine Hill Bridge is the oldest standing bridge in Ohio. Its three stone arches span approximately 385 feet (117 m).

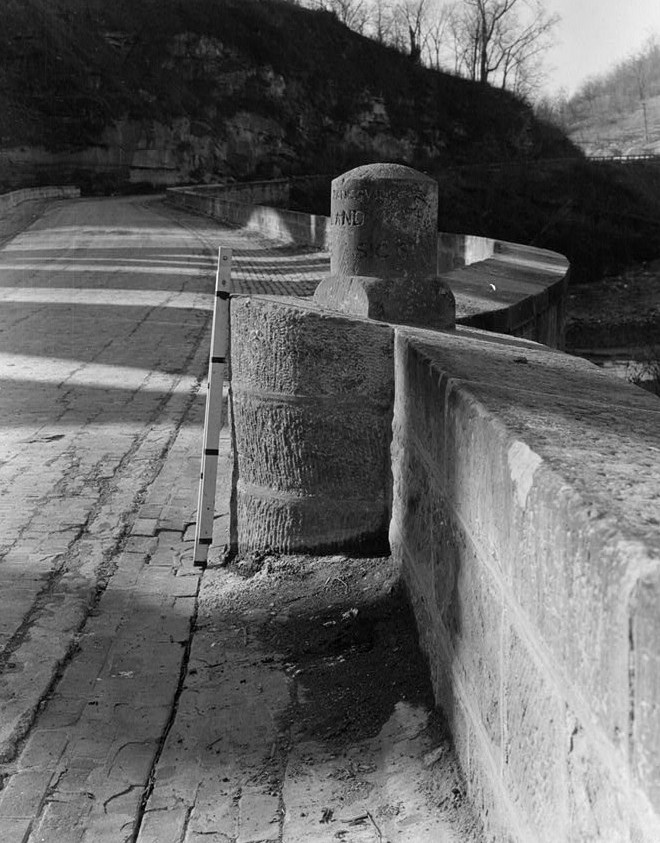
The S Bridge with mile marker on right.

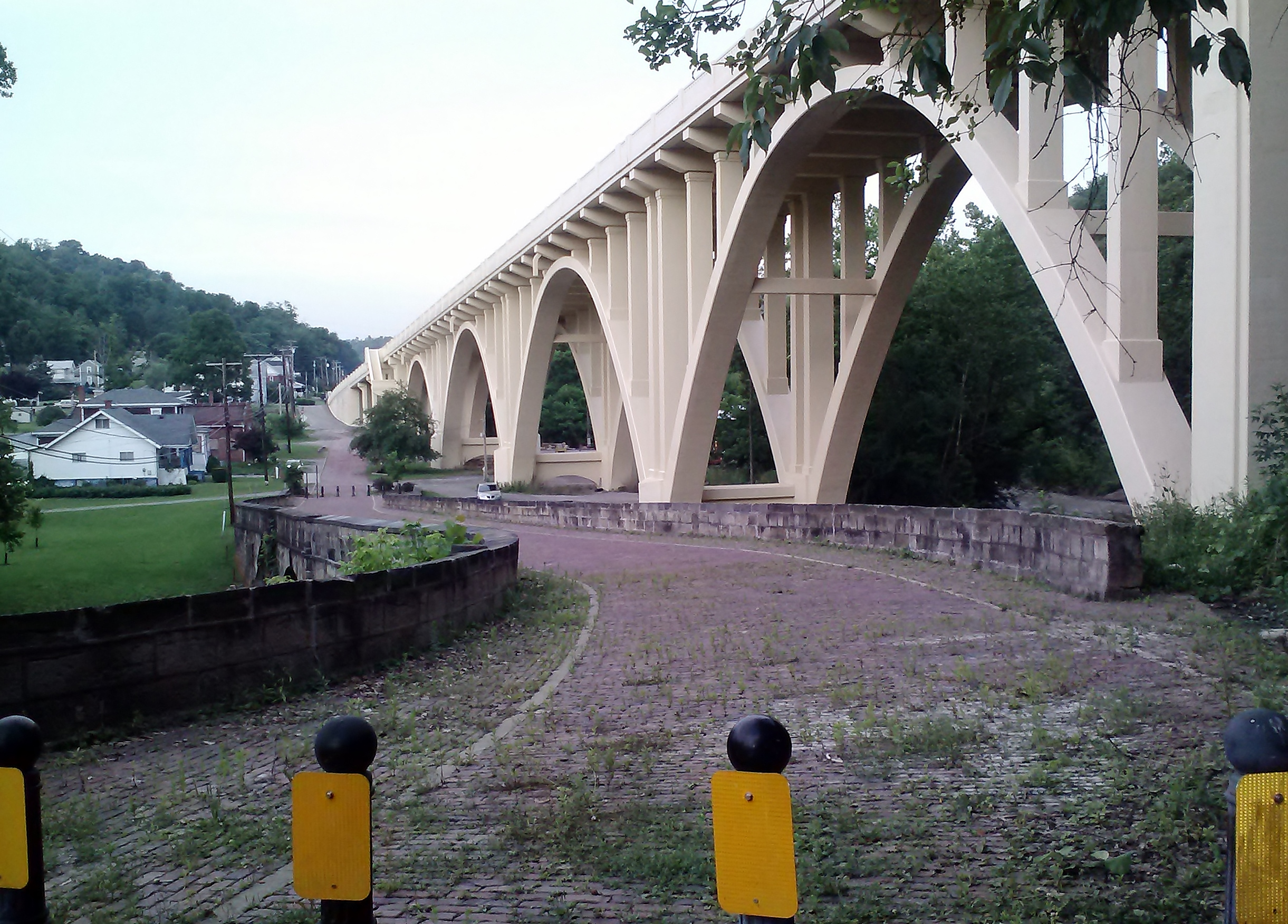
Blaine Hill "S" Bridge in July 2013 with Blaine Hill Viaduct on the right
