= Wheeling Township, Belmont County, Ohio =

Township in Ohio, US

- Township
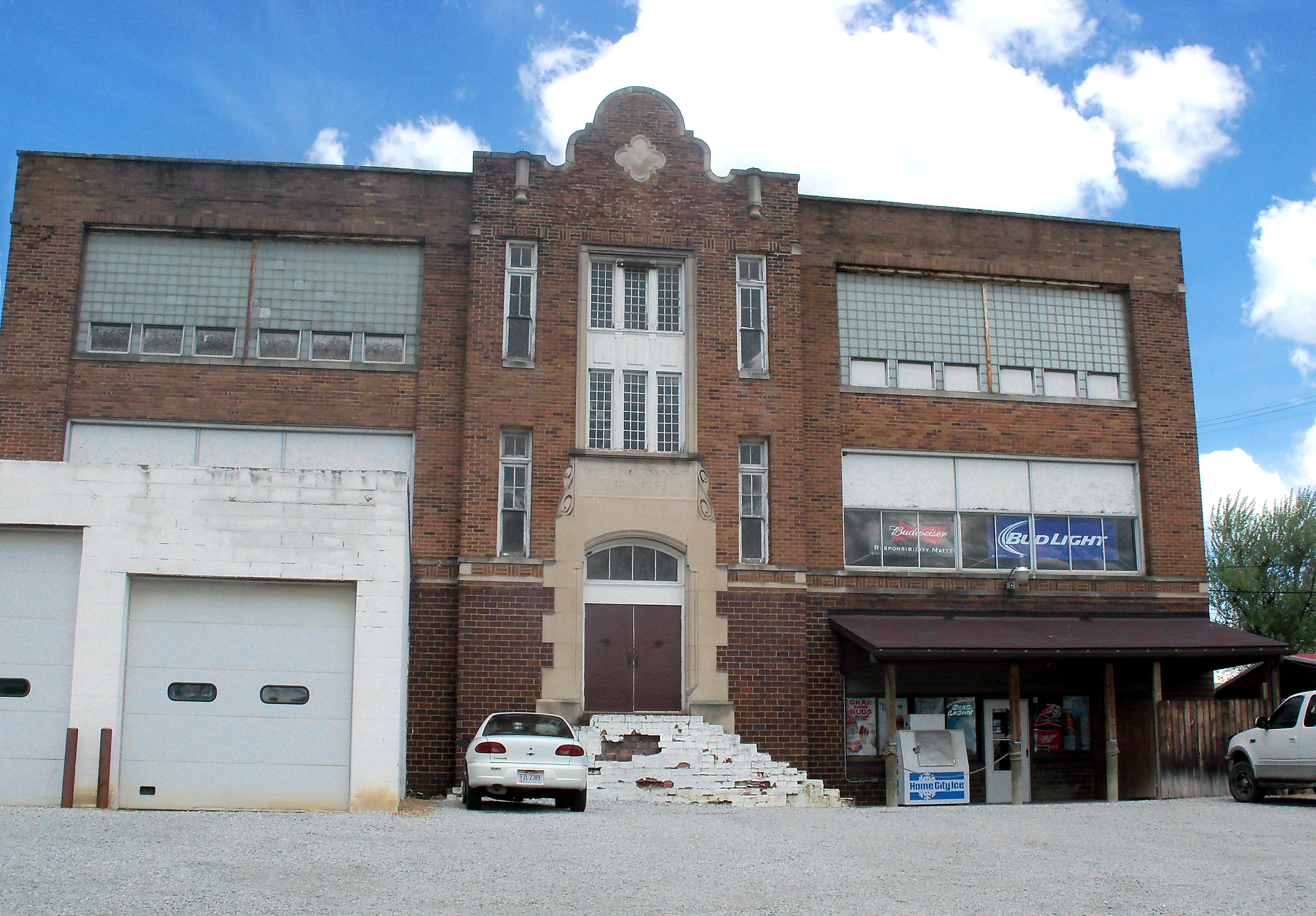
- Former Wheeling Township School in Fairpoint, now a bar.

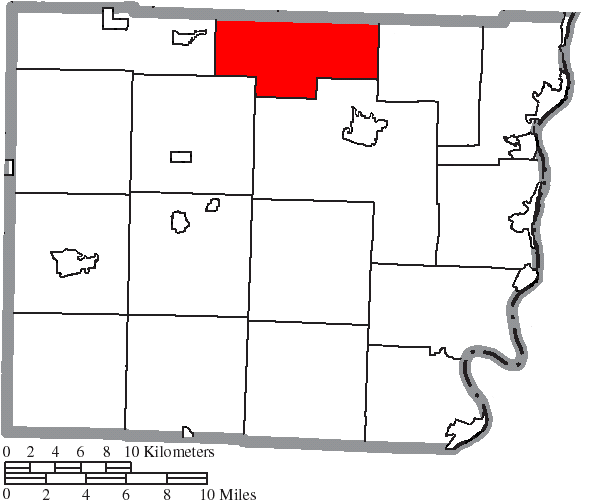
- Location of Wheeling Township in Belmont County
- Coordinates: 40°7′22″N 80°56′43″W
- Country: United States
- State: Ohio
- County: Belmont

Area
  - Total: 27.5 sq mi (71.2 km^{2})
  - Land: 26.9 sq mi (69.7 km^{2})
  - Water: 0.58 sq mi (1.5 km^{2})
- Elevation: 1,217 ft (371 m)

Population (2020)
  - Total: 1,604
  - Density: 59.6/sq mi (23.0/km^{2})
- Time zone: UTC-5 (Eastern (EST))
  - Summer (DST): UTC-4 (EDT)
- FIPS code: 39-84602
- GNIS feature ID: 1085790

Wheeling Township is one of the sixteen townships of Belmont County, Ohio, United States. The 2020 census recorded 1,604 people in the township.

== Geography ==
Located in the northern part of the county, it borders the following townships:

- Short Creek Township, Harrison County - north
- Mount Pleasant Township, Jefferson County - northeast corner
- Colerain Township - east
- Richland Township - southeast
- Union Township - southwest
- Flushing Township - west
- Athens Township, Harrison County - northwest

No municipalities are located in Wheeling Township, although the unincorporated community of Fairpoint lies in the township's east.

== Name and history ==
Wheeling Township was organised in 1808. Wheeling Township took its name from its largest waterway, Wheeling Creek. From its source west of Lafferty and south of Flushing, Wheeling Creek winds along the southern regions of Wheeling Township, through and near communities such as Oco, Bannock, Crabapple, Flushing and Blainesville. Wheeling Creek has several tributary creeks that flow through the township, including Crabapple Creek, which begins just west of the township's boundary, Campbell Run, a tributary of Crabapple Creek, McCracken Run, meeting Wheeling Creek in Fairpoint, Love's Run, whose confluence is just east of Fairpoint and Cox Run, which flows into the creek in Blainesville.

Wheeling Township was known for its large production of wheat, which was processed by one of the many gristmills that once existed, and shipped to New Orleans.

Statewide, the only other Wheeling Township is located in Guernsey County.

== Government ==
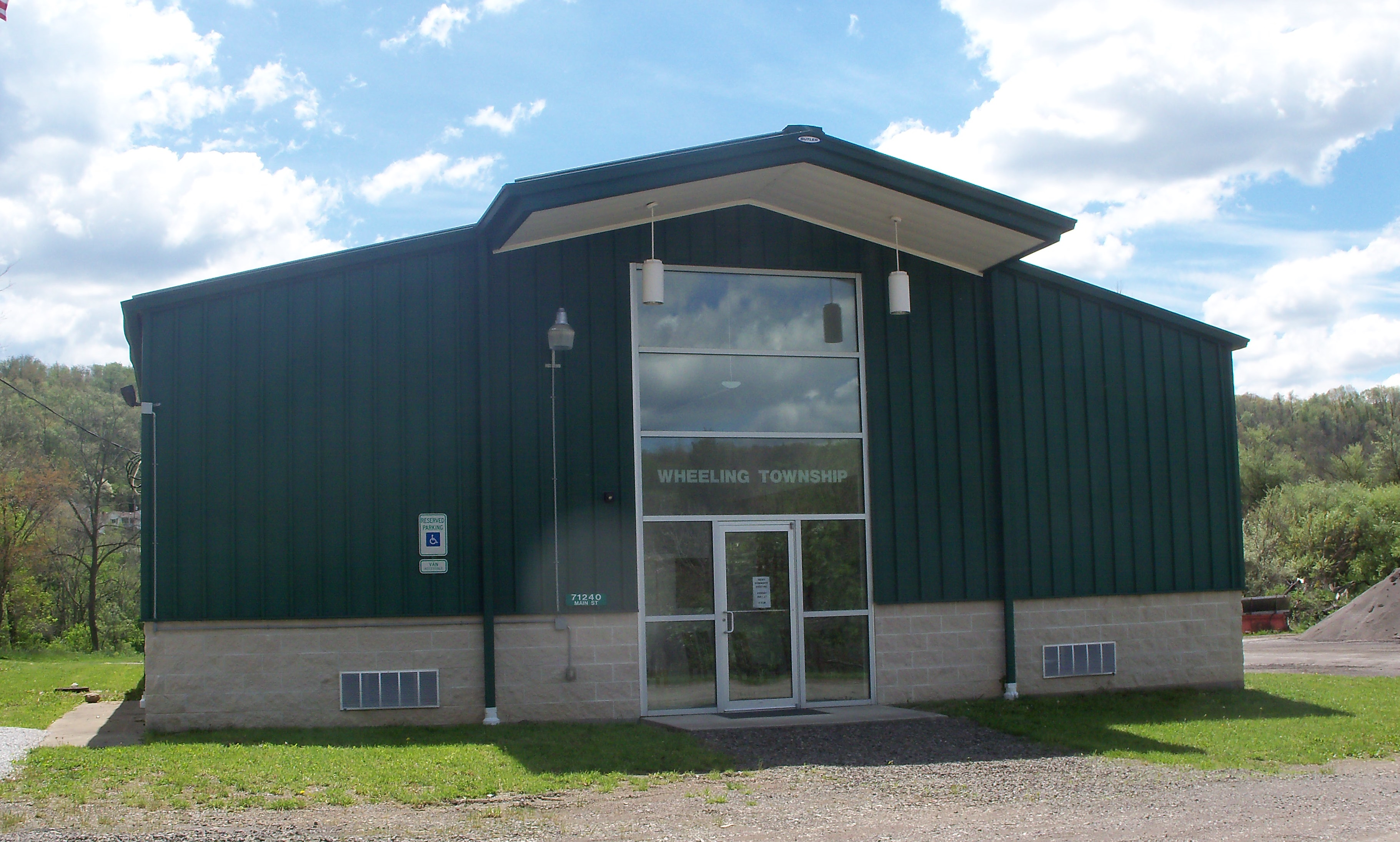
Wheeling Township town Hall

The township is governed by a three-member board of trustees, who are elected in November of odd-numbered years to a four-year term beginning on the following 1 January. Two are elected in the year after the presidential election and one is elected in the year before it. There is also an elected township fiscal officer, who serves a four-year term beginning on 1 April of the year after the election, which is held in November of the year before the presidential election. Vacancies in the fiscal officership or on the board of trustees are filled by the remaining trustees.
