= Robert H. Allison =

American politician and lawyer

Illinois House of Representatives
- In office 1935–1955

Personal details
- Born: July 25, 1893 Maynard, Ohio, US
- Died: December 31, 1959 (aged 66) Lafayette, Louisiana. US
- Party: Republican

Robert H. Allison (July 25, 1893 – December 31, 1959) was an American politician and lawyer.

Allison was born in Maynard, Ohio. He lost an arm in a mining accident. Allison went to Blackburn College, Washington University in St. Louis, and Illinois State University. Allison received his bachelor's and law degrees from Illinois Wesleyan University. He lived with his wife and family in Pekin, Illinois and practiced law in Pekin. Allison served in the Illinois House of Representatives from 1935 to 1955 and was a Republican. He ran for the Republican nomination in 1954 and lost the primary election to Harold Velde. Allison died suddenly on December 31, 1959, while hunting in a duck blind near Lafayette, Louisiana.
