= Lafferty, Ohio =

- Unincorporated community
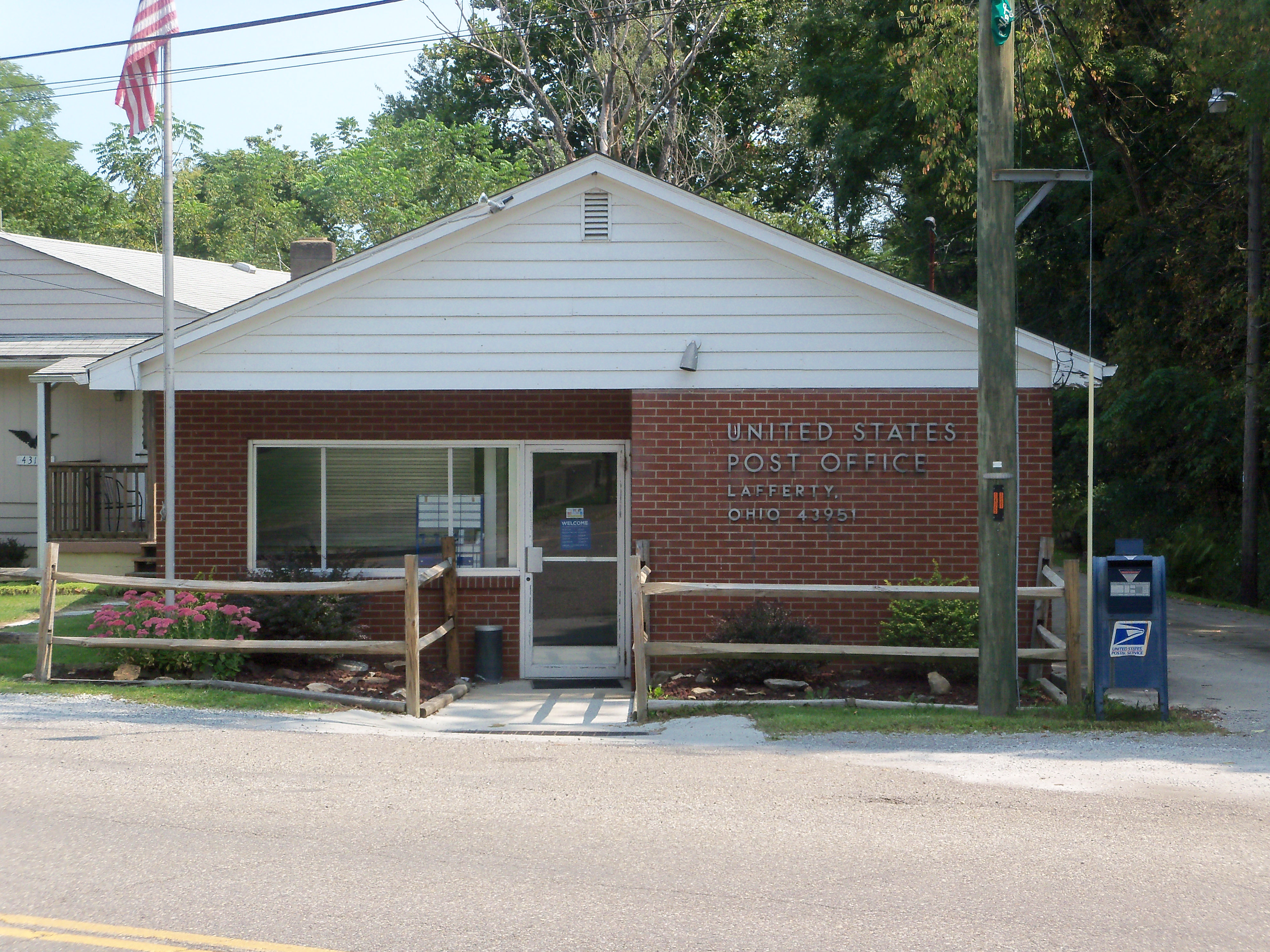
- Lafferty Post Office

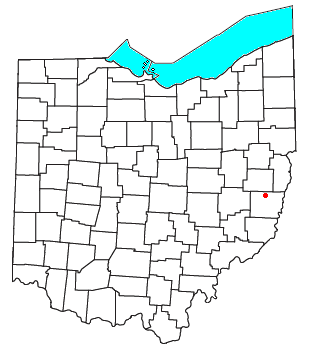
- Location of Lafferty, Ohio
- Coordinates: 40°06′51″N 81°01′08″W
- Country: United States
- State: Ohio
- County: Belmont
- Township: Union
- Elevation: 1,125 ft (343 m)

Population (2020)
  - Total: 255
- Time zone: UTC-5 (Eastern (EST))
  - Summer (DST): UTC-4 (EDT)
- ZIP code: 43951
- Area code: 740
- GNIS feature ID: 2628914

Lafferty is a census-designated place in northeastern Union Township, Belmont County, Ohio, United States, along Wheeling Creek. As of the 2020 census it had a population of 255. It has a post office with the ZIP code 43951.

Lafferty is part of the Wheeling, WV-OH Metropolitan Statistical Area.

The community was named after one Dr. Joseph Laf(f)erty.

== Notable person ==
- Frank John "Skeeter" Scalzi, baseball player
