= Holloway, Ohio =

- Village
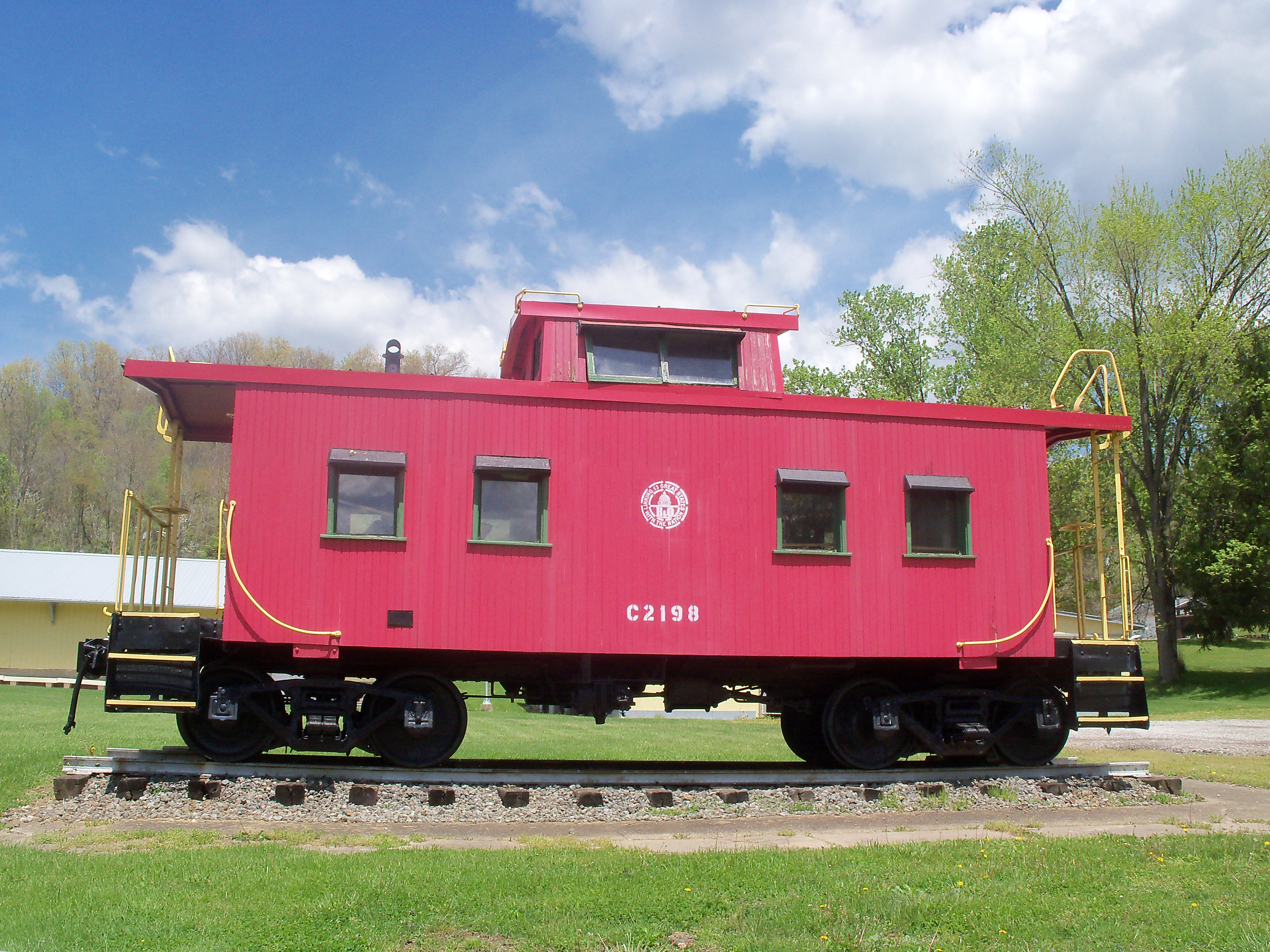
- B&O caboose C-2198 in the village park

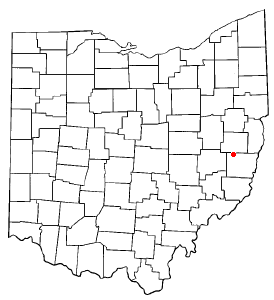
- Location of Holloway, Ohio

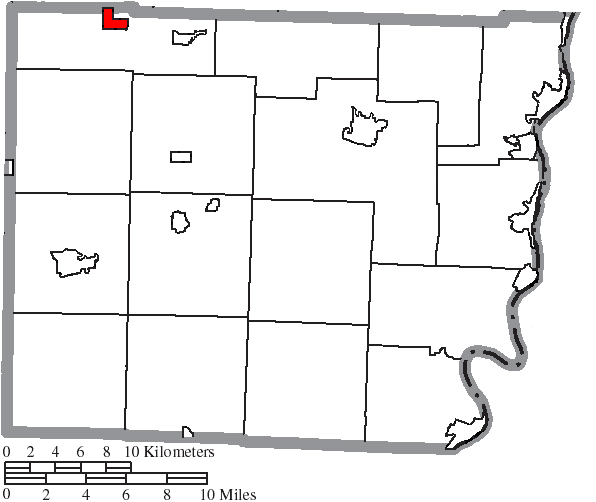
- Location of Holloway in Belmont County
- Coordinates: 40°09′39″N 81°07′35″W
- Country: United States
- State: Ohio
- County: Belmont
- Township: Flushing

Area
  - Total: 0.96 sq mi (2.49 km^{2})
  - Land: 0.95 sq mi (2.46 km^{2})
  - Water: 0.012 sq mi (0.03 km^{2})
- Elevation: 925 ft (282 m)

Population (2020)
  - Total: 330
  - Density: 347.7/sq mi (134.24/km^{2})
- Time zone: UTC-5 (Eastern (EST))
  - Summer (DST): UTC-4 (EDT)
- ZIP code: 43985
- Area code: 740
- FIPS code: 39-35924
- GNIS feature ID: 2398527

Holloway is a village in Belmont County, Ohio, United States. The population was 330 at the 2020 census. It is part of the Wheeling metropolitan area. Holloway was laid out in 1883, and named after the local Holloway family.

== Geography ==
According to the United States Census Bureau, the village has a total area of 0.96 square miles (2.49 km^{2}), of which 0.95 square miles (2.46 km^{2}) is land and 0.01 square miles (0.03 km^{2}) is water.

== Demographics ==
Historical population
Census	Pop.	Note	%±
1910	786		—
1920	974		23.9%
1930	772		−20.7%
1940	733		−5.1%
1950	654		−10.8%
1960	541		−17.3%
1970	488		−9.8%
1980	459		−5.9%
1990	354		−22.9%
2000	345		−2.5%
2010	338		−2.0%
2020	330		−2.4%
U.S. Decennial Census

=== 2010 census ===
As of the census of 2010, there were 338 people, 139 households, and 91 families living in the village. The population density was 355.8 inhabitants per square mile (137.4/km^{2}). There were 153 housing units at an average density of 161.1 per square mile (62.2/km^{2}). The racial makeup of the village was 97.6% White, 0.6% Native American, 0.3% Asian, 1.2% from other races, and 0.3% from two or more races. Hispanic or Latino of any race were 1.5% of the population.

There were 139 households, of which 31.7% had children under the age of 18 living with them, 44.6% were married couples living together, 12.2% had a female householder with no husband present, 8.6% had a male householder with no wife present, and 34.5% were non-families. 28.1% of all households were made up of individuals, and 12.9% had someone living alone who was 65 years of age or older. The average household size was 2.43 and the average family size was 2.97.

The median age in the village was 39 years. 23.1% of residents were under the age of 18; 8.8% were between the ages of 18 and 24; 25.7% were from 25 to 44; 26.3% were from 45 to 64; and 16% were 65 years of age or older. The gender makeup of the village was 50.0% male and 50.0% female.

=== 2000 census ===
As of the census of 2000, there were 345 people, 139 households, and 101 families living in the village. The population density was 396.6 inhabitants per square mile (153.1/km^{2}). There were 151 housing units at an average density of 173.6 per square mile (67.0/km^{2}). The racial makeup of the village was 98.84% White, 0.29% Native American, and 0.87% from two or more races.

There were 139 households, out of which 26.6% had children under the age of 18 living with them, 52.5% were married couples living together, 10.8% had a female householder with no husband present, and 27.3% were non-families. 24.5% of all households were made up of individuals, and 11.5% had someone living alone who was 65 years of age or older. The average household size was 2.48 and the average family size was 2.86.

In the village, the population was spread out, with 22.6% under the age of 18, 9.9% from 18 to 24, 24.9% from 25 to 44, 23.8% from 45 to 64, and 18.8% who were 65 years of age or older. The median age was 40 years. For every 100 females there were 107.8 males. For every 100 females age 18 and over, there were 107.0 males.

The median income for a household in the village was $25,313, and the median income for a family was $26,042. Males had a median income of $25,938 versus $13,750 for females. The per capita income for the village was $11,480. About 18.4% of families and 20.3% of the population were below the poverty line, including 24.3% of those under age 18 and 10.8% of those age 65 or over.
