= Bridgeport, Ohio =

- Village
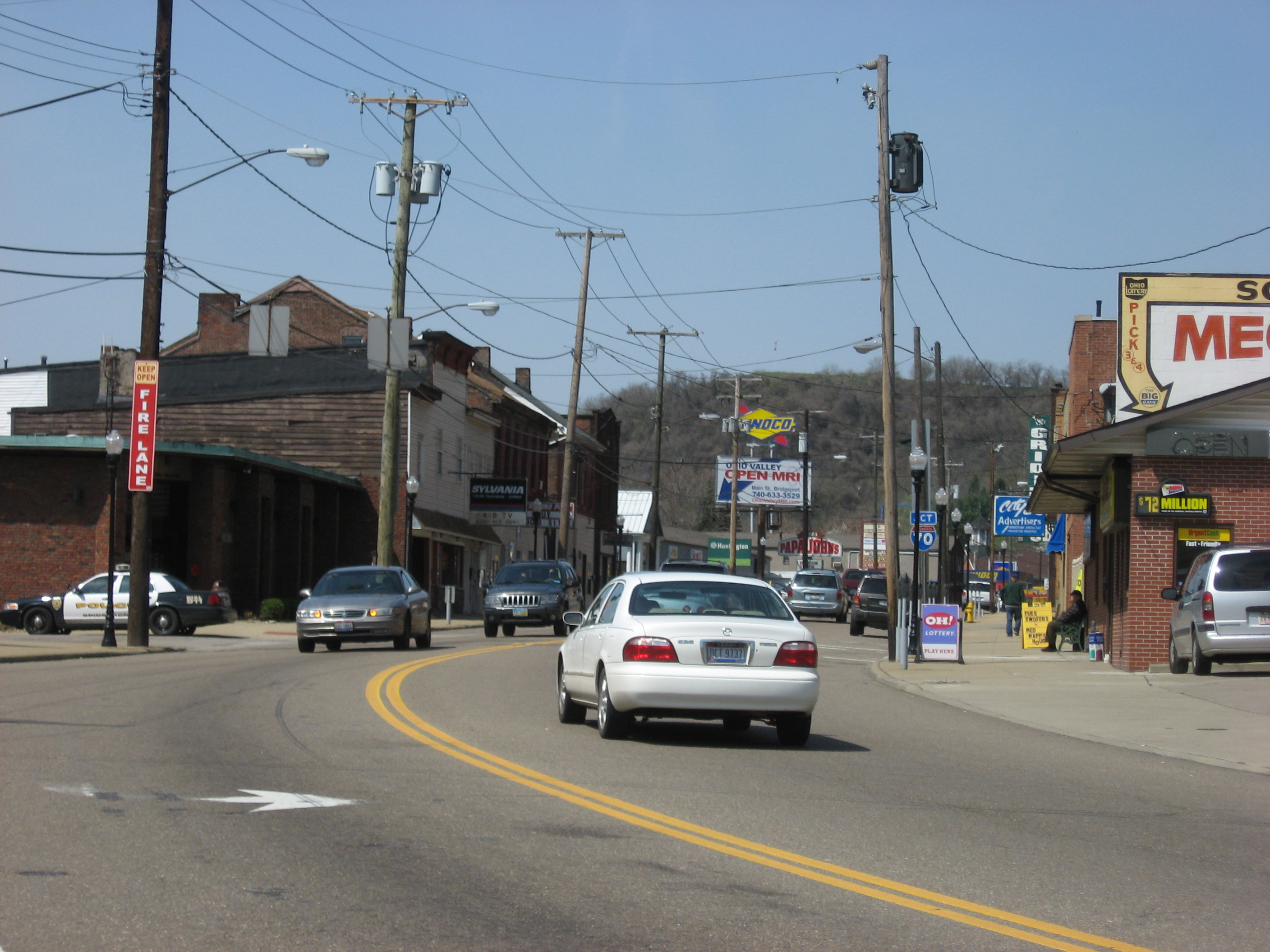
- Downtown Bridgeport
- Nickname: "Gateway to the West"
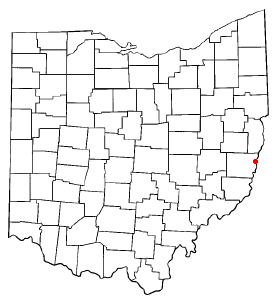
- Location of Bridgeport, Ohio

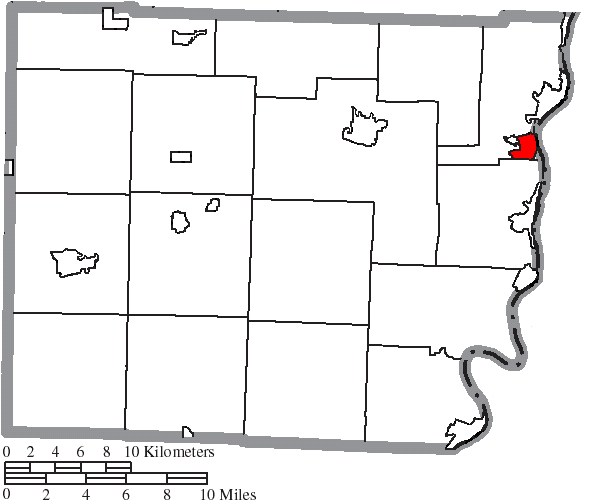
- Location of Bridgeport in Belmont County
- Coordinates: 40°4′20″N 80°44′37″W
- Country: United States
- State: Ohio
- County: Belmont
- Township: Pease

Government
  - Type: Statutory Village
  - Mayor: Norma Teasdale

Area
  - Total: 1.37 sq mi (3.56 km^{2})
  - Land: 1.37 sq mi (3.54 km^{2})
  - Water: 0.012 sq mi (0.03 km^{2})
- Elevation: 660 ft (200 m)

Population (2020)
  - Total: 1,582
  - Estimate (2023): 1,534
  - Density: 1,157.8/sq mi (447.01/km^{2})
- Time zone: UTC-5 (Eastern (EST))
  - Summer (DST): UTC-4 (EDT)
- ZIP code: 43912
- Area code: 740
- FIPS code: 39-08560
- GNIS feature ID: 1064487
- Website: villageofbridgeport.com/

Bridgeport is a village in eastern Belmont County, Ohio, United States. It lies across the Ohio River from Wheeling, West Virginia, at the mouth of Wheeling Creek and is connected by two bridges to Wheeling Island. The population was 1,582 at the 2020 census. It is part of the Wheeling metropolitan area.

== History ==
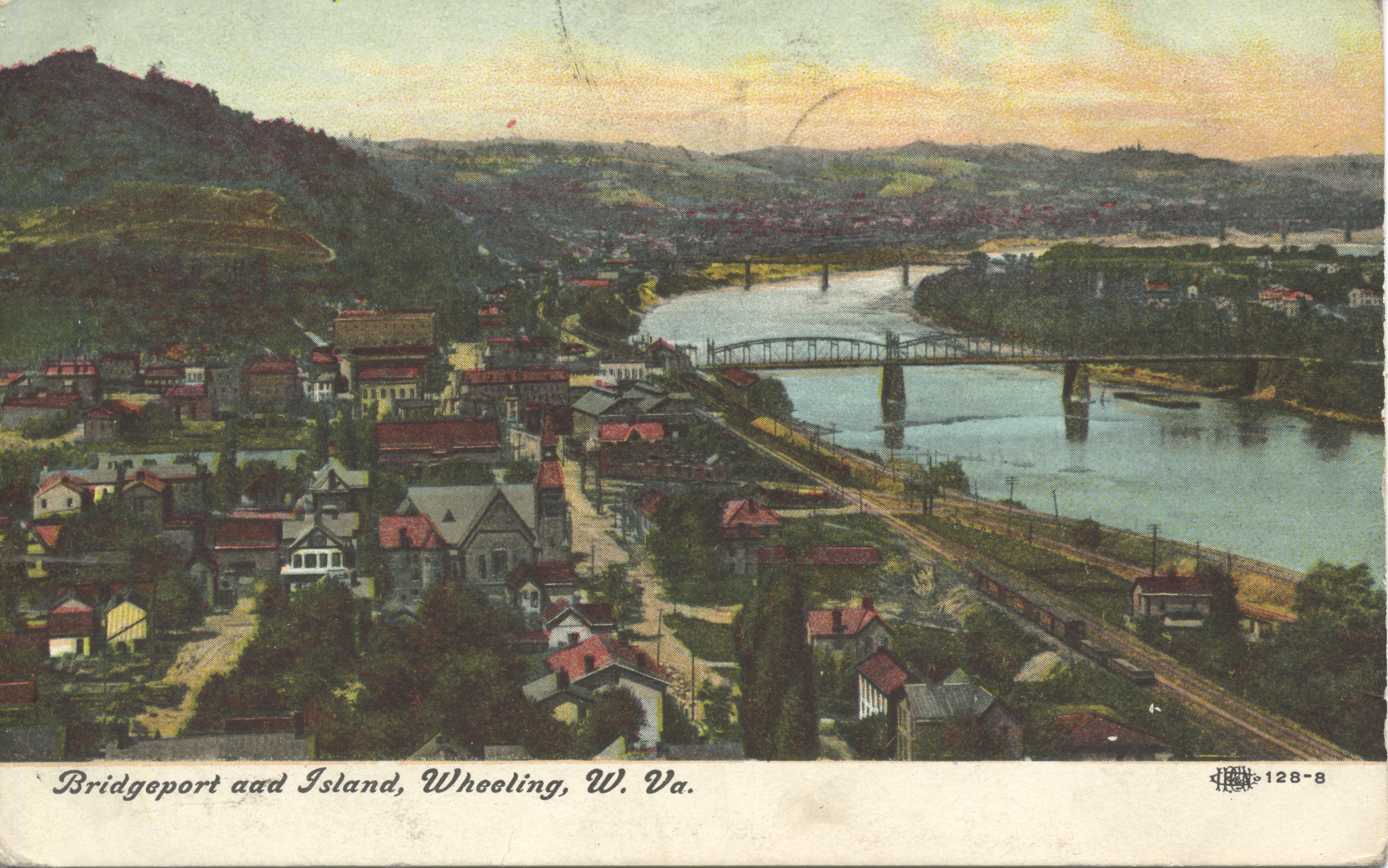
Bridgeport and Wheeling Island in 1904

Bridgeport was originally known as Canton, and under the latter name was laid out in 1806 by Colonel Ebenezer Zane. The present name is for a bridge constructed near the town site in the 1810s.

== Geography ==
Bridgeport is located along the Ohio River at the mouth of Wheeling Creek. There are two crossings into West Virginia, the Military Order of the Purple Heart Bridge and a portion of the Fort Henry Bridge. Formerly, the Aetnaville Bridge and Bridgeport Bridge made the crossing to Wheeling Island, but the former has been closed to traffic and the latter has been demolished.

According to the United States Census Bureau, the village has a total area of 1.38 square miles (3.57 km^{2}), of which 1.37 square miles (3.55 km^{2}) is land and 0.01 square miles (0.03 km^{2}) is water.

=== Climate ===
Climate data for Bridgeport, Ohio
Month	Jan	Feb	Mar	Apr	May	Jun	Jul	Aug	Sep	Oct	Nov	Dec	Year
Record high °F (°C)	73 (23)	78 (26)	84 (29)	90 (32)	92 (33)	98 (37)	103 (39)	98 (37)	95 (35)	88 (31)	81 (27)	73 (23)	103 (39)
Mean daily maximum °F (°C)	38 (3)	42 (6)	51 (11)	63 (17)	73 (23)	82 (28)	85 (29)	84 (29)	77 (25)	66 (19)	54 (12)	42 (6)	63 (17)
Mean daily minimum °F (°C)	21 (−6)	23 (−5)	31 (−1)	39 (4)	50 (10)	59 (15)	64 (18)	63 (17)	56 (13)	43 (6)	35 (2)	27 (−3)	43 (6)
Record low °F (°C)	−16 (−27)	−3 (−19)	5 (−15)	20 (−7)	33 (1)	41 (5)	49 (9)	50 (10)	37 (3)	26 (−3)	15 (−9)	−10 (−23)	−16 (−27)
Average precipitation inches (mm)	2.71 (69)	2.53 (64)	3.46 (88)	3.02 (77)	4.35 (110)	3.82 (97)	4.92 (125)	3.59 (91)	3.31 (84)	2.16 (55)	3.32 (84)	3.15 (80)	40.34 (1,024)
Average snowfall inches (cm)	7.2 (18)	4.2 (11)	3.8 (9.7)	1.6 (4.1)	0 (0)	0 (0)	0 (0)	0 (0)	0 (0)	0.1 (0.25)	0.9 (2.3)	3.4 (8.6)	21.2 (53.95)

== Demographics ==
Historical population
Census	Pop.	Note	%±
1830	169		—
1840	329		94.7%
1860	641		—
1870	1,178		83.8%
1880	2,395		103.3%
1890	3,369		40.7%
1900	3,963		17.6%
1910	3,974		0.3%
1920	3,977		0.1%
1930	4,655		17.0%
1940	4,853		4.3%
1950	4,309		−11.2%
1960	3,824		−11.3%
1970	3,001		−21.5%
1980	2,642		−12.0%
1990	2,318		−12.3%
2000	2,186		−5.7%
2010	1,831		−16.2%
2020	1,582		−13.6%
2023 (est.)	1,534	▼	−3.0%
U.S. Decennial Census

=== 2000 census ===
As of the census of 2000, there were 2,186 people, 973 households, and 586 families living in the village. The population density was 1,569.0 inhabitants per square mile (605.8/km^{2}). There were 1,090 housing units at an average density of 782.3 per square mile (302.0/km^{2}). The racial makeup of the village was 90.81% White, 7.55% African American, 0.14% Native American, 0.14% Asian, 0.55% from other races, and 0.82% from two or more races. Hispanic or Latino of any race were 0.50% of the population.

There were 973 households, out of which 26.9% had children under the age of 18 living with them, 42.0% were married couples living together, 13.7% had a female householder with no husband present, and 39.7% were non-families. 36.1% of all households were made up of individuals, and 15.8% had someone living alone who was 65 years of age or older. The average household size was 2.24 and the average family size was 2.89.

In the village, the population was spread out, with 23.2% under the age of 18, 6.2% from 18 to 24, 29.0% from 25 to 44, 24.5% from 45 to 64, and 17.1% who were 65 years of age or older. The median age was 40 years. For every 100 females, there were 88.9 males. For every 100 females age 18 and over, there were 85.4 males.

The median income for a household in the village was $25,685, and the median income for a family was $33,231. Males had a median income of $24,156 versus $18,333 for females. The per capita income for the village was $14,723. About 11.5% of families and 16.2% of the population were below the poverty line, including 19.1% of those under age 18 and 7.3% of those age 65 or over.

=== 2010 census ===
As of the census of 2010, there were 1,831 people, 810 households, and 472 families living in the village. The population density was 1,336.5 inhabitants per square mile (516.0/km^{2}). There were 943 housing units at an average density of 688.3 per square mile (265.8/km^{2}). The racial makeup of the village was 89.7% White, 6.9% African American, 0.2% Asian, 0.2% from other races, and 3.0% from two or more races. Hispanic or Latino of any race were 0.2% of the population.

There were 810 households, of which 25.4% had children under the age of 18 living with them, 40.2% were married couples living together, 13.3% had a female householder with no husband present, 4.7% had a male householder with no wife present, and 41.7% were non-families. 35.6% of all households were made up of individuals, and 14.9% had someone living alone who was 65 years of age or older. The average household size was 2.26 and the average family size was 2.91.

The median age in the village was 43.3 years. 19.5% of residents were under the age of 18; 9% were between the ages of 18 and 24; 23.5% were from 25 to 44; 30.7% were from 45 to 64; and 17.4% were 65 years of age or older. The gender makeup of the village was 48.8% male and 51.2% female.

== Education ==
Bridgeport has a public library, a branch of the Belmont County District Library.

== Notable people ==
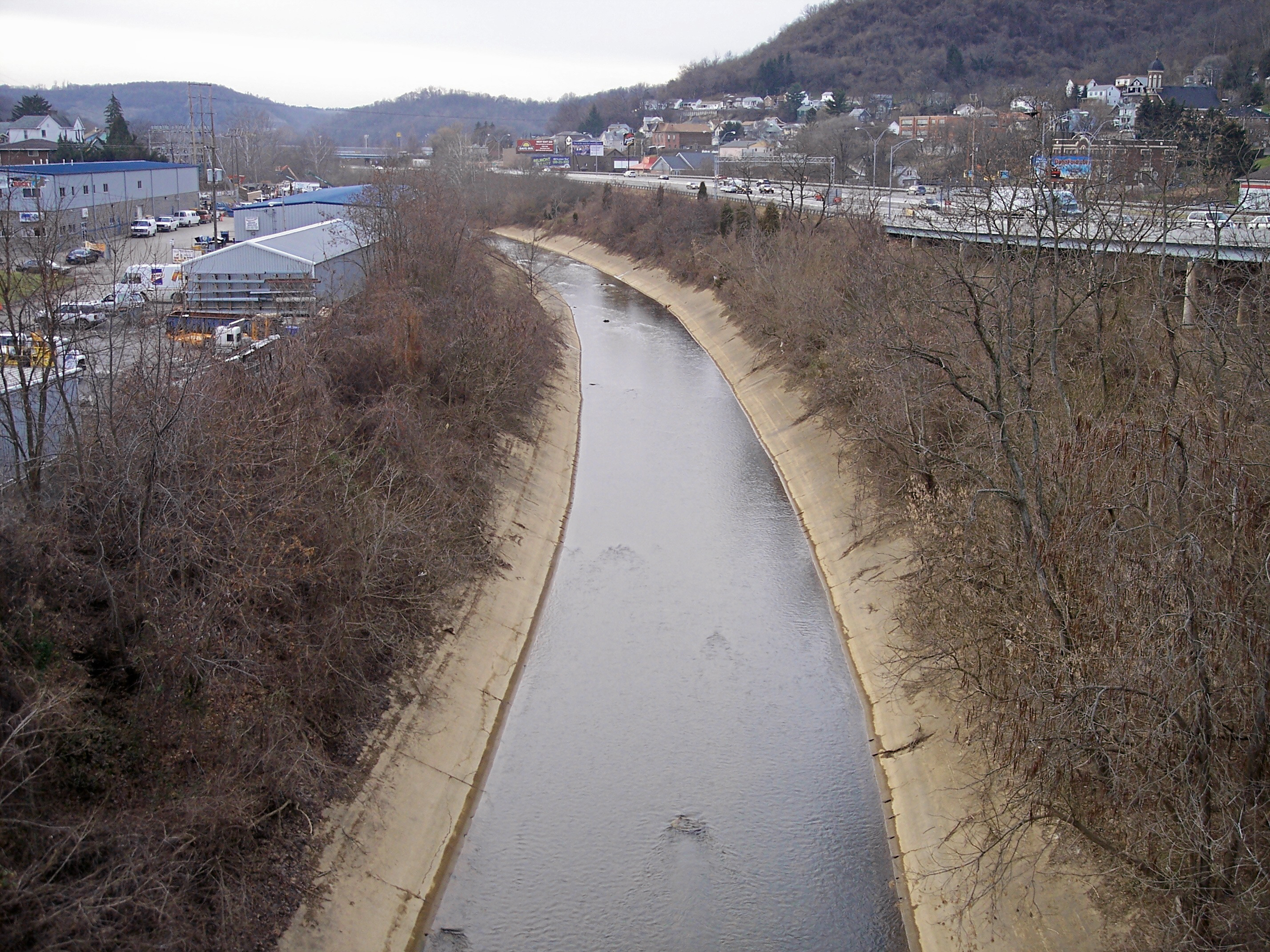
Wheeling Creek near its mouth in Bridgeport in 2006

- Johnny Blatnik, former professional baseball player
- Bobby Douglas, Olympic wrestler
- John Havlicek, Hall of Fame basketball player for Ohio State and Boston Celtics
- Bill Jobko, National Football League football player
- Joseph Henry Sharp, painter
- Thomas Clarke Theaker, Republican U.S. Representative from Ohio
- Bill White, Major League Baseball player
- John Todd Zimmer, leading ornithologist

== See also ==
- List of cities and towns along the Ohio River
