= Union Township, Belmont County, Ohio =

Township in Ohio, US

Union Township, Union County, Ohio
- Township
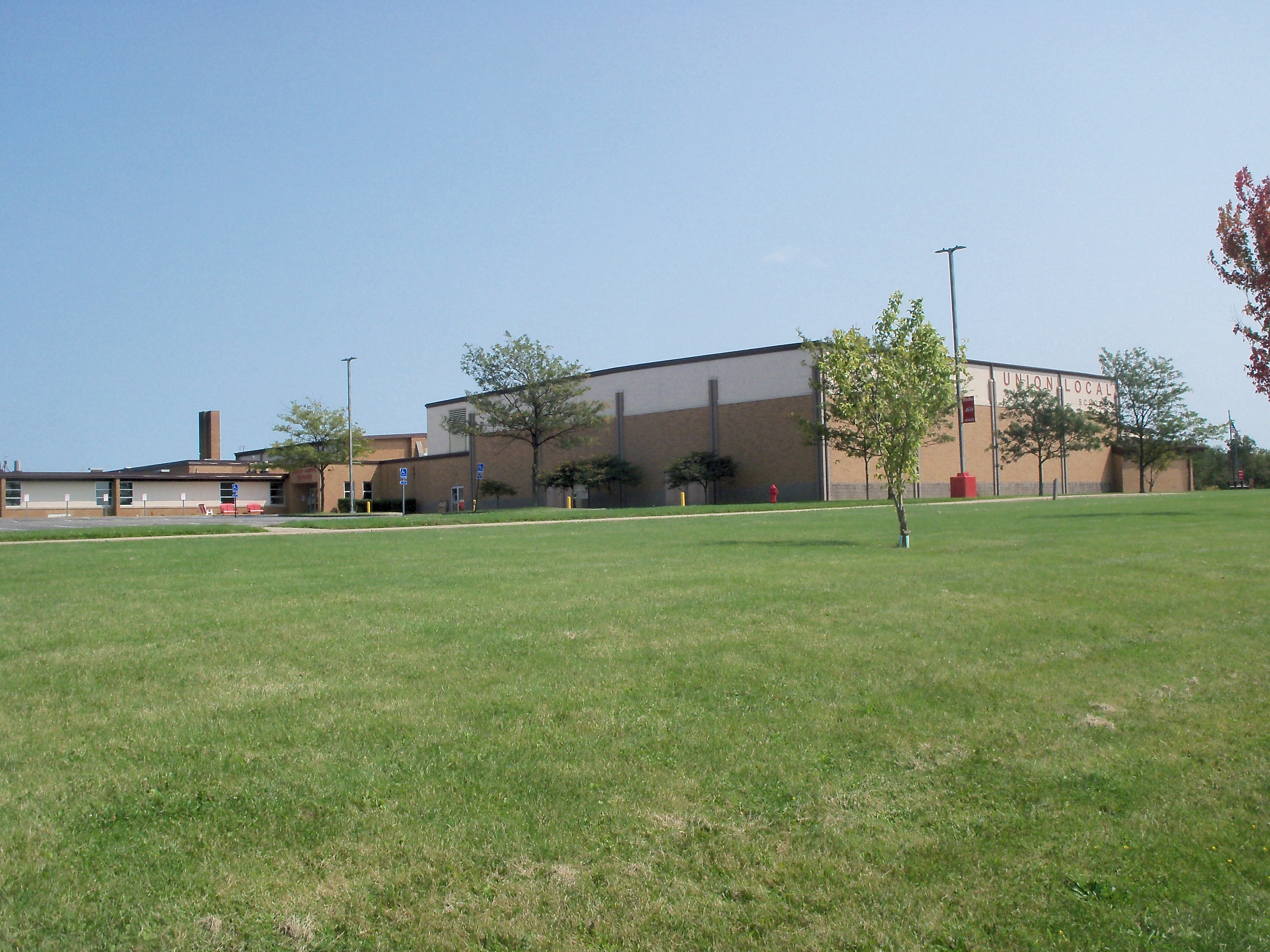
- Union Local High School, just east of Morristown

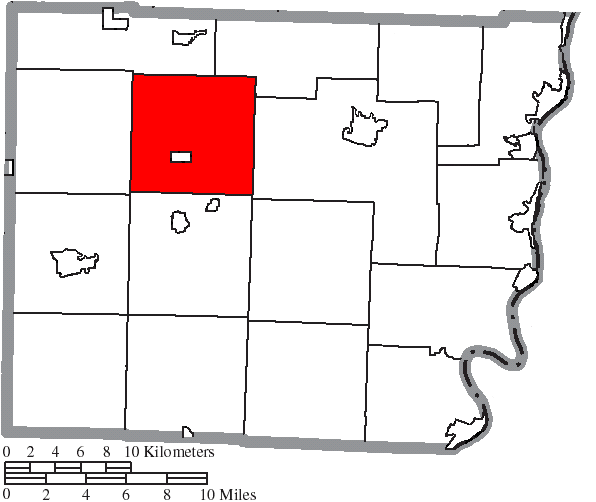
- Location of Union Township in Belmont County
- Coordinates: 40°4′28″N 81°2′17″W
- Country: United States
- State: Ohio
- County: Belmont

Area
  - Total: 35.5 sq mi (91.9 km^{2})
  - Land: 34.7 sq mi (89.9 km^{2})
  - Water: 0.77 sq mi (2.0 km^{2})
- Elevation: 1,270 ft (387 m)

Population (2020)
  - Total: 2,275
  - Density: 65.5/sq mi (25.3/km^{2})
- Time zone: UTC-5 (Eastern (EST))
  - Summer (DST): UTC-4 (EDT)
- FIPS code: 39-78218
- GNIS feature ID: 1085786

Union Township is one of the sixteen townships of Belmont County, Ohio, United States. The 2020 census found 2,275 people in the township.

== Geography ==
Located in the central part of the county, it borders the following townships:

- Flushing Township - northwest
- Goshen Township - south
- Kirkwood Township - west
- Richland Township - east
- Wheeling Township - northeast

The village of Morristown is located in central Union Township, and the unincorporated community of Lafferty lies in the township's northeast.

== Name and history ==
Union Township was established August 15,1804.

It is one of twenty-seven Union Townships statewide.

In 1833, Union Township contained several flouring mills, saw mills, fulling mills, and carding machines.

== Government ==
The township is governed by a three-member board of trustees, who are elected in November of odd-numbered years to a four-year term beginning on the following January 1. Two are elected in the year after the presidential election and one is elected in the year before it. There is also an elected township fiscal officer, who serves a four-year term beginning on April 1 of the year after the election, which is held in November of the year before the presidential election. Vacancies in the fiscal officership or on the board of trustees are filled by the remaining trustees.
