= Brookside, Ohio =

- Village
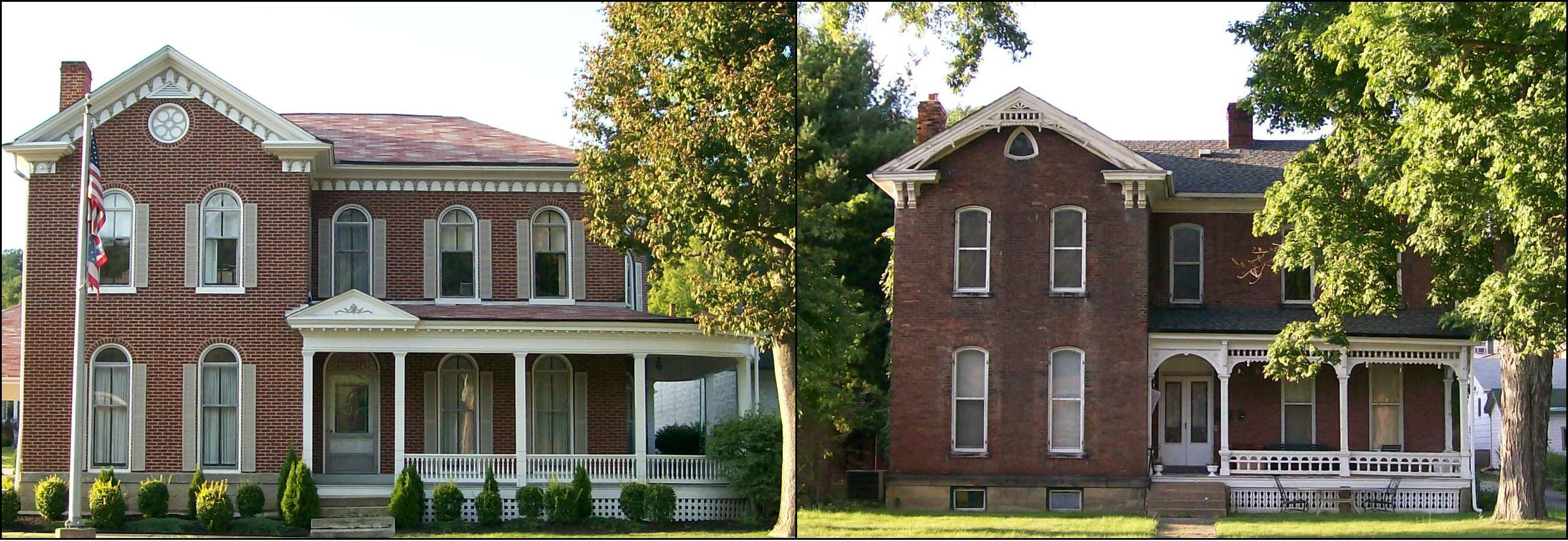
- Thomas and Wesley Frasier Houses

- Logo

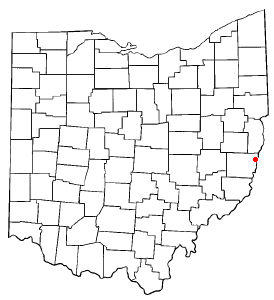
- Location of Brookside, Ohio

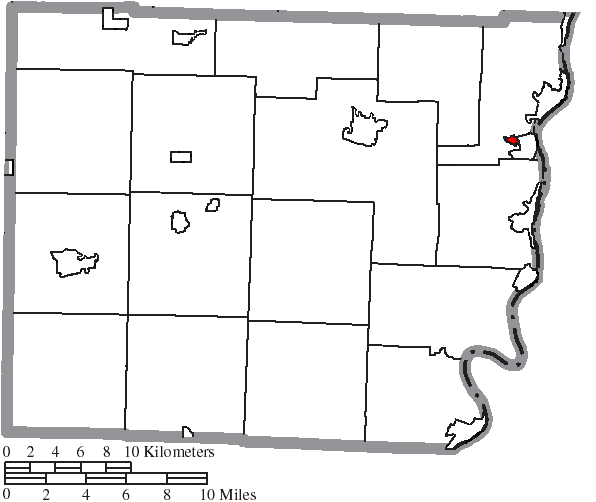
- Location of Brookside in Belmont County
- Coordinates: 40°04′15″N 80°45′38″W
- Country: United States
- State: Ohio
- County: Belmont
- Township: Pease

Area
  - Total: 0.18 sq mi (0.46 km^{2})
  - Land: 0.17 sq mi (0.45 km^{2})
  - Water: 0.0039 sq mi (0.01 km^{2})
- Elevation: 653 ft (199 m)

Population (2020)
  - Total: 538
  - Estimate (2023): 524
  - Density: 3,106.8/sq mi (1,199.54/km^{2})
- Time zone: UTC-5 (Eastern (EST))
  - Summer (DST): UTC-4 (EDT)
- ZIP code: 43912
- Area code(s): 740 & 220
- FIPS code: 39-09316
- GNIS feature ID: 2397468
- Website: www.brooksideoh.com

Brookside is a village in eastern Belmont County, Ohio, United States. The population was 538 at the 2020 census. It is part of the Wheeling metropolitan area.

== Geography ==
According to the United States Census Bureau, the village has a total area of 0.17 square miles (0.44 km^{2}), all land.

== Demographics ==
Historical population
Census	Pop.	Note	%±
1900	249		—
1910	383		53.8%
1920	426		11.2%
1930	882		107.0%
1940	975		10.5%
1950	845		−13.3%
1960	831		−1.7%
1970	939		13.0%
1980	887		−5.5%
1990	703		−20.7%
2000	644		−8.4%
2010	632		−1.9%
2020	538		−14.9%
2023 (est.)	524	▼	−2.6%
U.S. Decennial Census

=== 2010 census ===
As of the census of 2010, there were 632 people, 282 households, and 193 families living in the village. The population density was 3,717.6 inhabitants per square mile (1,435.4/km^{2}). There were 305 housing units at an average density of 1,794.1 per square mile (692.7/km^{2}). The racial makeup of the village was 96.2% White, 1.9% African American, 0.5% Native American, 0.2% from other races, and 1.3% from two or more races. Hispanic or Latino of any race were 0.3% of the population.

There were 282 households, of which 26.2% had children under the age of 18 living with them, 47.9% were married couples living together, 14.2% had a female householder with no husband present, 6.4% had a male householder with no wife present, and 31.6% were non-families. 27.0% of all households were made up of individuals, and 12.1% had someone living alone who was 65 years of age or older. The average household size was 2.24 and the average family size was 2.66.

The median age in the village was 44.5 years. 19.1% of residents were under the age of 18; 6.3% were between the ages of 18 and 24; 25.7% were from 25 to 44; 31.3% were from 45 to 64; and 17.7% were 65 years of age or older. The gender makeup of the village was 48.4% male and 51.6% female.

=== 2000 census ===
As of the census of 2000, there were 644 people, 283 households, and 191 families living in the village. The population density was 3,714.7 inhabitants per square mile (1,434.3/km^{2}). There were 304 housing units at an average density of 1,753.5 per square mile (677.0/km^{2}). The racial makeup of the village was 97.05% White, 2.17% African American, 0.31% from other races, and 0.47% from two or more races.

There were 283 households, out of which 25.8% had children under the age of 18 living with them, 55.1% were married couples living together, 9.9% had a female householder with no husband present, and 32.2% were non-families. 30.4% of all households were made up of individuals, and 18.4% had someone living alone who was 65 years of age or older. The average household size was 2.28 and the average family size was 2.79.

In the village, the population was spread out, with 19.6% under the age of 18, 7.8% from 18 to 24, 23.4% from 25 to 44, 29.5% from 45 to 64, and 19.7% who were 65 years of age or older. The median age was 44 years. For every 100 females there were 83.5 males. For every 100 females age 18 and over, there were 83.0 males.

The median income for a household in the village was $34,297, and the median income for a family was $43,594. Males had a median income of $31,250 versus $25,625 for females. The per capita income for the village was $17,295. About 5.1% of families and 7.8% of the population were below the poverty line, including 11.1% of those under age 18 and 10.0% of those age 65 or over.
