= Lansing, Ohio =

- Unincorporated community and census-designated place
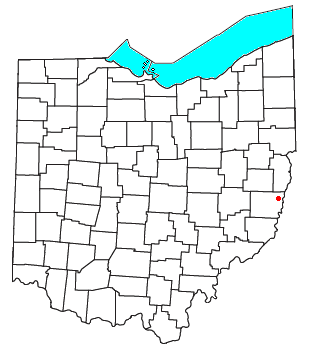
- Location of Lansing, Ohio
- Coordinates: 40°04′33″N 80°47′31″W
- Country: United States
- State: Ohio
- County: Belmont
- Township: Pease
- Elevation: 705 ft (215 m)

Population (2020)
  - Total: 596
- Time zone: UTC-5 (Eastern (EST))
  - Summer (DST): UTC-4 (EDT)
- ZIP code: 43934
- Area code: 740
- GNIS feature ID: 2628924

Lansing is a census-designated place in northern Pease Township, Belmont County, Ohio, United States, along Wheeling Creek. As of the 2020 census it had a population of 596. It has a post office with the ZIP code 43934.

Lansing is part of the Wheeling, WV-OH Metropolitan Statistical Area.

A post office called Lansing has been in operation since 1898. Besides the post office, Lansing had a church, built there in 1834. Lansing was known as Soaptown from 1860 to 1889.
