= Blaine, Ohio =

U.S. city in Ohio

Coordinates: 40°04′07″N 80°48′34″W

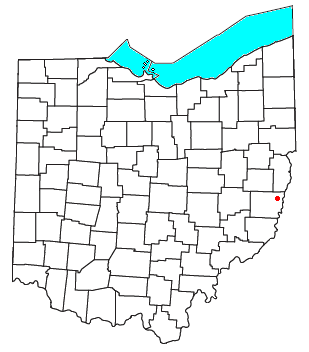
Location of Blaine, Ohio

Blaine is an unincorporated community in northern Pease Township, Belmont County, Ohio, United States. It is located along Wheeling Creek. It has a post office with the ZIP code 43909. As of the 2020 census, Blaine had a population of 473.

Blaine is part of the Wheeling, WV-OH Metropolitan Statistical Area.

The community was named after James G. Blaine.

== Notable person ==
- Phil Niekro, Baseball Hall of Fame pitcher
