= Flushing Township, Belmont County, Ohio =

Township in Ohio, US

- Township
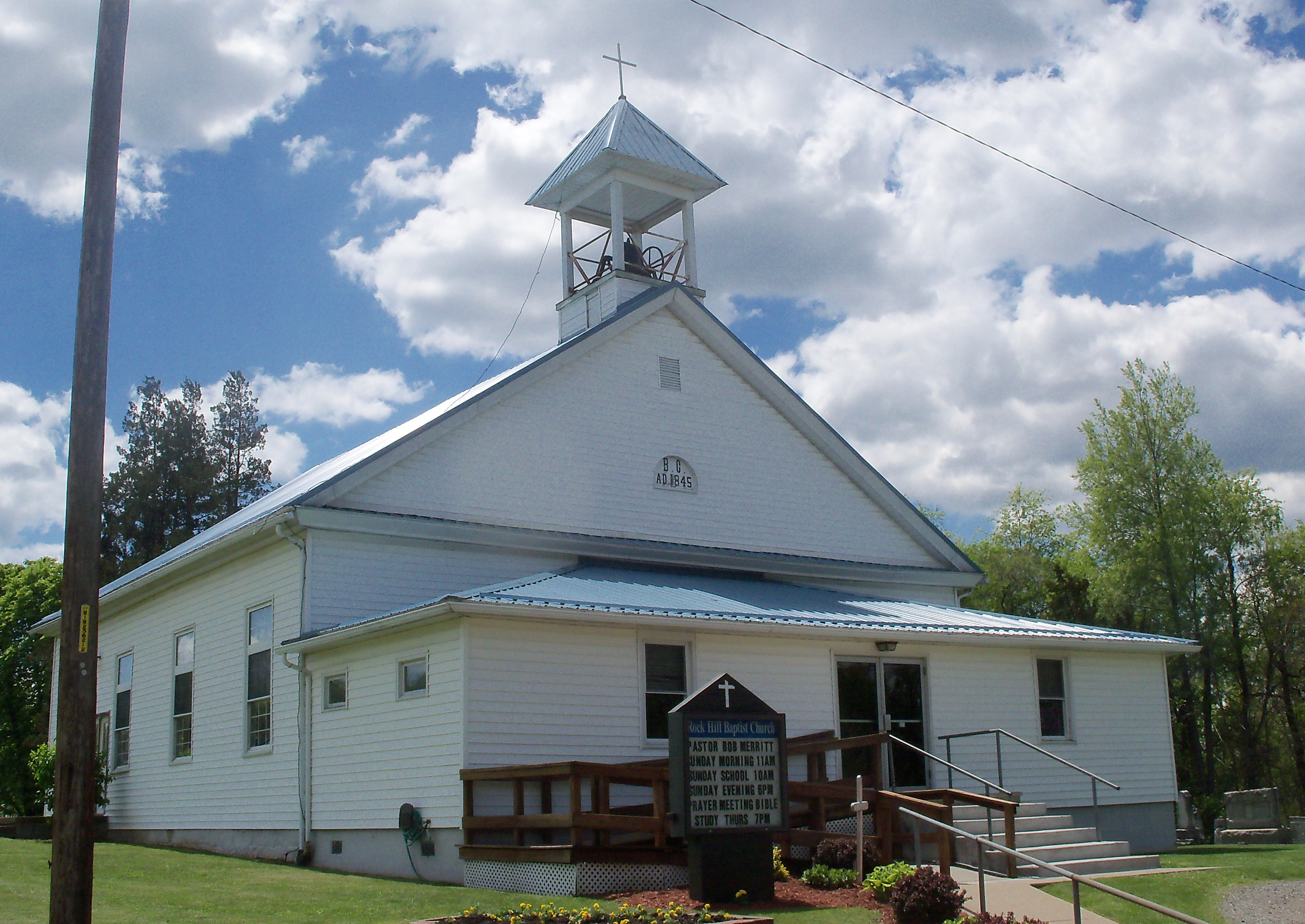
- Rock Hill Baptist Church (1845), on County Road 72

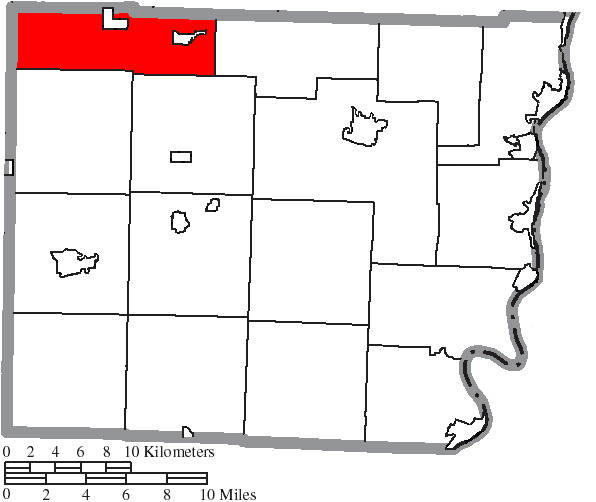
- Location of Flushing Township in Belmont County
- Coordinates: 40°8′51″N 81°6′46″W
- Country: United States
- State: Ohio
- County: Belmont

Area
  - Total: 31.0 sq mi (80.2 km^{2})
  - Land: 28.0 sq mi (72.5 km^{2})
  - Water: 3.0 sq mi (7.7 km^{2})
- Elevation: 1,060 ft (323 m)

Population (2020)
  - Total: 1,936
  - Density: 69.2/sq mi (26.7/km^{2})
- Time zone: UTC-5 (Eastern (EST))
  - Summer (DST): UTC-4 (EDT)
- ZIP code: 43977
- Area code: 740
- FIPS code: 39-27566
- GNIS feature ID: 1085777

Flushing Township is one of the sixteen townships of Belmont County, Ohio, United States. The 2020 census found 1,936 people in the township.

== Geography ==
Located in the northwestern corner of the county, it borders the following townships:

- Moorefield Township, Harrison County - north
- Athens Township, Harrison County - northeast
- Wheeling Township - east
- Union Township - southeast
- Kirkwood Township - south
- Londonderry Township, Guernsey County - west
- Freeport Township, Harrison County - northwest

Two villages are located in Flushing Township: Flushing in the east, and Holloway in the north.

== Name and history ==
It is the only Flushing Township statewide.

Flushing Township was organized in 1817. Flushing Township was originally settled chiefly by Quakers.

== Government ==
The township is governed by a three-member board of trustees, who are elected in November of odd-numbered years to a four-year term beginning on the following January 1. Two are elected in the year after the presidential election and one is elected in the year before it. There is also an elected township fiscal officer, who serves a four-year term beginning on April 1 of the year after the election, which is held in November of the year before the presidential election. Vacancies in the fiscal officership or on the board of trustees are filled by the remaining trustees.
