= Rice Lake =

Rice Lake may refer to:

== Communities ==
- Rice Lake, Minnesota, a city in Saint Louis County
- Rice Lake (CDP), Minnesota, a census-designated place in Clearwater County
- Rice Lake (ghost town), Minnesota, a former village in Dodge and Steele counties
- Rice Lake, Wright County, Minnesota, an unincorporated community
- Rice Lake Township, Ward County, North Dakota
- Rice Lake, Ontario
- Rice Lake, Wisconsin, a city in Barron County
- Rice Lake (town), Wisconsin, a town adjacent to the medium-sized city

== Lakes ==
=== Canada ===
- Rice Lake (Ontario), a lake located in Northumberland and Peterborough counties in south-eastern Ontario
- Rice Lake (Saskatchewan), a lake in Saskatchewan

=== United States ===
- Rice Lake (Illinois), site of the island Miserable
- Rice Lake (Cook County, Minnesota)
- Rice Lake (Dodge County, Minnesota), a lake in Rice Lake State Park, near Owatonna, Minnesota
- Rice Lake (Hubbard County, Minnesota)
- Rice Lake (Mille Lacs County, Minnesota)
- Rice Lake (Pope County, Minnesota)
- Rice Lake (Rice County, Minnesota)
- Rice Lake (Wadena County, Minnesota)
- Rice Lake (Ward County, North Dakota)
- Rice Lake (Washington County, Minnesota)
- Rice Lake (Barron County, Wisconsin)

== Other uses ==
- Rice Lake National Wildlife Refuge, a wildlife refuge near McGregor, Minnesota
- Rice Lake State Park, a state park of Minnesota, east of Owatonna
- Rice Lake Band of Mississippi Chippewa, now part of the Mille Lacs Band of Ojibwe in east-central Minnesota
- Rice Lake (VIA station)
- Rice Lake, Dallas and Menomonie Railway, a railroad company based in Wisconsin.

== See also ==
- Rice (disambiguation)
