= Rice (disambiguation) =

Rice is a cereal grain.

Rice, Rice's, or Rices may also refer to:

== Arts and entertainment ==
- Rice (novel), a Chinese novel by Su Tong
- Rice (1957 film), a Japanese film
- Rice (1963 film), a South Korean film
- Rice (band), a Japanese duo
- Rice Music, a Japanese record label

== Buildings ==
- The Rice (Houston), formerly Rice Hotel, a historic building in Houston, Texas
- Rice Apartments, Eugene Oregon, on the National Register of Historic Places (NRHP)
- Rice Covered Bridge, Pennsylvania, on the NRHP
- Rice House (disambiguation), various buildings on the NRHP
- Rice Stadium (disambiguation)

== People and fictional characters ==
- Rice (surname), including a list of people and fictional characters with the surname
- Rice (given name), a list of people

== Places ==
=== United States ===
- Rice, California, a former town
  - Rice Army Airfield, near Rice, California
- Rice, Kansas, an unincorporated community
- Rice, Minnesota, a city
- Rice, Ohio, an unincorporated community
- Rice, Oregon, an unincorporated community
- Rice, Texas, a city
- Rice, Virginia, an unincorporated community
- Rice, Washington, an unincorporated community
- Rice County, Kansas
- Rice County, Minnesota
- Rice Township (disambiguation)
- Fort Rice, a 19th-century frontier military fort in what is now North Dakota
- Rice Fork, a tributary of the Eel River, California
- Rices Spring, a spring in Georgia
- Rice Valley, California

=== United States or Canada ===
- Rice Creek (disambiguation)
- Rice Lake (disambiguation)
- Rice Strait, Nunavut, Canada

=== Antarctica ===
- Rice Bastion, a mountain mass
- Rice Ridge

== Schools ==
- Rice University, Houston, Texas
  - Rice Owls, the athletic program of Rice University
  - The Rice School, a public combined elementary and secondary school associated with Rice University
- Rice High School (disambiguation)
- Rice Middle School, Plano, Texas
- Rice College, a secondary school in Ireland

== RICE ==
- RICE (medicine), a mnemonic acronym relating to treatment for soft-tissue injuries
- RICE (chemotherapy), a chemotherapy regimen containing Rituximab, Ifosfamide, Carboplatin and Etoposide
- Radio Ice Cherenkov Experiment, a Cherenkov emission detection project
- RICE chart, a table for tracking chemical reactions

== Other uses ==
- Rice (cooking), a food–processing technique
- Rice Epicurean Markets, an American specialty grocery chain
- Rice coding, a subset of Golomb coding used with lossless data compression

== See also ==
- Rise (disambiguation)
