= List of islands by name (M) =

This article features a list of islands sorted by their name beginning with the letter M.

== M ==
Island's name	Island group(s)	Country/countries
Ma Wan	Hong Kong	China
Maadhiguvaru	Gaafu Alif Atoll	Maldives
Machias Seal	Disputed Between Maine and New Brunswick	Disputed between United States and Canada
Mackay	North Carolina and Virginia	United States
Mackenzie King	Queen Elizabeth Islands, Nunavut and Northwest Territories	Canada
Mackinac	Lake Huron, Michigan	United States
Maclellan	Tennessee River, Tennessee	United States
Macquarie	Southern Ocean, Tasmania	Australia
Madagascar	Indian Ocean	Madagascar
La Maddalena	Sardinia	Italy
Iles des Madeleines		Senegal
Madeline	Lake Superior, Wisconsin	United States
Madeira	Madeira	Portugal
Madrid Bar	Mississippi River, Kentucky	United States
Madura	East Java	Indonesia
Maewo	Pacific Ocean	Vanuatu
Mafia	Tanzanian Spice Islands	Tanzania
Isla Magdalena	Baja California Sur	Mexico
Magerøya	Nordkapp, Finnmark	Norway
Mageshima	Ōsumi Islands part of the Satsunan Islands group of the Ryukyu Islands	Japan
Magusaiai	Shortland Islands	Solomon Islands
Maiao	Windward Islands, Society Islands, French Polynesia	Overseas Lands of France
Mainau	Lake Constance	Germany
Mainland	Shetland Islands	Scotland
Main Station	Lake Huron, Ontario	Canada
Mallorca	Balearic Islands	Spain
Majuli	Brahmaputra River, Assam	India
Majuro	Ratak Chain	Marshall Islands
Makada	Duke of York Islands	Papua New Guinea
Makanrushi	Kuril Islands, Sakhalin Oblast	Russia
Makatea	Tuamotus, French Polynesia	France
Makema	Tuamotus, French Polynesia	France
Makura	Shepherd Islands	Vanuatu
Malakula	New Hebrides	Vanuatu
Malcolm	British Columbia	Canada
Malden	Line Islands	Kiribati
Mal Grad	Lake Prespa	Albania
Mallard	Lake Audubon, North Dakota	United States
Malo	Pacific Ocean	Vanuatu
Maloelap Atoll	Ratak Chain	Marshall Islands
Malpelo		Colombia
Malta	Maltese islands	Malta
Makronisos		Greece
Mamula	Adriatic Sea	Montenegro
Man	Ontario	Canada
Mana	Porirua Harbour	New Zealand
Manda	Lamu Archipelago	Kenya
Mandø	North Frisian Islands	Denmark
Mangaia	Cook Islands	Cook Islands
Manhattan	New York	United States
Manihi	King George Islands, Tuamotus, French Polynesia	France
Manihiki	Cook Islands	Cook Islands
Manilaid	Gulf of Riga	Estonia
Manitou	Lake Superior, Michigan	United States
Manitou	Apostle Islands, Wisconsin	United States
Manitoulin	Lake Huron, Ontario	Canada
Manoel	Maltese islands	Malta
Mansel	Nunavut	Canada
Manuae	Cook Islands	Cook Islands
Manuae	Leeward Islands, Society Islands, French Polynesia	French Polynesia
Manus	Admiralty Islands	Papua New Guinea
Maple	Mississippi River, Missouri	United States
Ilha de Marajó		Brazil
Marawah, United Arab Emirates	Persian Gulf	United Arab Emirates
Mare	California	United States
Maréchal	Beira Baixa islands	Portugal
Marettimo	Aegadian Islands	Italy
Isla Margarita	Nueva Esparta	Venezuela
Margitsziget	Danube River	Hungary
Maria	Tasmania	Australia
Maria Cleofas	Islas Marías, Nayarit	Mexico
Maria Madre	Islas Marías, Nayarit	Mexico
Maria Magdalena	Islas Marías, Nayarit	Mexico
Marie-Galante	Guadeloupe, Lesser Antilles	France
Marinduque	Luzon	Philippines
Marinha Nova	Beira Litoral islands	Portugal
Mark	Lake Winnipesaukee, New Hampshire	United States
Marmara	Marmara Islands	Turkey
Marrowstone	Puget Sound, Washington	United States
Marsh	Louisiana	United States
Marshall	Maine	United States
Martha's Vineyard	Massachusetts	United States
Martin	Louisiana	United States
Ilhas Martin Vaz	Atlantic Ocean	Brazil
Martinhal	Algarve islands	Portugal
Martinique	Lesser Antilles	France
Martuska-sziget	Danube River	Hungary
Masbate Island	Masbate	Philippines
Maskali		Djibouti
Masnedø		Denmark
Mason	Mississippi River, Missouri	United States
Mason's	Mystic River, Connecticut	United States
Massey	Queen Elizabeth Islands, Nunavut	Canada
Matadouce	Beira Litoral islands	Portugal
Matagorda	Texas	United States
Mataiva	Palliser Islands, Tuamotus, French Polynesia	France
Matakana	Bay of Plenty	New Zealand
Mataso	Shepherd Islands	Vanuatu
Mathraki	Ionian Islands	Greece
Matia	San Juan Islands, Washington	United States
Matinicus	Maine	United States
Matiu	Wellington Harbour	New Zealand
Maatsukyer	Maatsuyker Island Group, Tasmania	Australia
Matsu	Lienchang County	Republic of China
Matty	Nunavut	Canada
Matua	Kuril Islands, Sakhalin Oblast	Russia
Matureivavao	Acteon Group, Tuamotus, French Polynesia	France
Maupiti	Windward Islands, Society Islands, French Polynesia	Overseas Lands of France
Maud	Marlborough Sounds	New Zealand
Maui	Hawaiian Islands, Hawaii	United States
Mauke	Cook Islands	Cook Islands
Mauritius	Mascarene Islands	Mauritius
Maurice Island		Latvia
Maury	Puget Sound, Washington	United States
Mausinsel	Bavaria, Bavaria	Germany
Maxwell	Georgian Bay Ontario	Canada
Mayne	Gulf Islands, British Columbia	Canada
Mayor	Bay of Plenty	New Zealand
Mayotte	Comoros archipelago	France
Mazaki		Cyprus
McCallum	Lake Huron, Ontario	Canada
McCauley	British Columbia	Canada
McCormicks	Susquehanna River, Pennsylvania	United States
McCoy	Georgian Bay Ontario	Canada
McCoy	Mississippi River, Illinois	United States
McEvers	Illinois River, Illinois	United States
McLaren	Georgian Bay Ontario	Canada
McNeil	Puget Sound, Washington	United States
McQuade	Georgian Bay Ontario	Canada
McQueens	Georgia	United States
Isle of Meadows	New York	United States
Medny	Komandorski Islands, Alaska	Owned by the United States, controlled by Russia
Meganisi	Ionian Islands	Greece
Mehetia	Windward Islands, Society Islands, French Polynesia	Overseas Lands of France
Meighen	Queen Elizabeth Islands, Nunavut	Canada
Mejit	Ratak chain	Marshall Islands
Melbourne	Nunavut	Canada
Mele	Melanesia	Vanuatu
Mellum	East Frisian Islands	Germany
Melville	Queen Elizabeth Islands, Nunavut and Northwest Territories	Canada
Melvin	Lake Winnipesaukee, New Hampshire	United States
Memmert	East Frisian Islands	Germany
Mendicant	Barataria Bay, Louisiana	United States
Merasheen	Newfoundland and Labrador	Canada
Mercer	Lake Washington, Washington	United States
Mercury		New Zealand
Merelava	Banks Islands	Vanuatu
Merig	Banks Islands	Vanuatu
Metinic	Maine	United States
Metoma	Torres Islands	Vanuatu
Michigan	Lake Superior, Wisconsin	United States
Michipicoten	Lake Superior, Ontario	Canada
Middle Andaman	Andaman Islands	India
Middle Bass	Bass Islands, Ohio	United States
Middle Brewster	Boston Harbor, Massachusetts	United States
Middle Duck	Lake Huron, Ontario	Canada
Middle Ground	Mississippi River, Mississippi	United States
Middle Ground Coastal Battery	Maharashtra	India
Middle	Lake Erie, Ontario	Canada
Middle	Ohio River, West Virginia	United States
Middle	Nightingale Islands, Tristan da Cunha	(United Kingdom) British overseas territory of Saint Helena, Ascension and Tristan da Cunha
Midgarth	Orkney Islands	Scotland
Mikurajima	Izu Islands	Japan
Mile	Lake Winnipesaukee, New Hampshire	United States
Mili Atoll	Ratak Chain	Marshall Islands
Mill	Nunavut	Canada
Mill Creek	Ohio River, West Virginia	United States
Mill Rock	New York	United States
Milos	Cyclades	Greece
Mimami daitō	Daitō Islands part of the Ryukyu Islands	Japan
Minami Kojima	Senkaku Islands	Disputed by Japan and China
Mindanao	Mindanao group	Philippines
Minicoy	Lakshadweep	India
Minister	Lake Winnipesaukee, New Hampshire	United States
Mink	Georgian Bay Ontario	Canada
Mink	Lake Winnipesaukee, New Hampshire	United States
Minna	Miyako Islands part of the Sakishima Islands part of the Ryukyu Islands	Japan
Minnicognashene	Georgian Bay Ontario	Canada
Menorca	Balearic Islands	Spain
Minquiers	Channel Islands	Jersey
Minu	Persian Gulf	Iran
Mioko	Duke of York Islands	Papua New Guinea
Miserable	Rice Lake, Illinois	United States
Mishka	Danube River	Bulgaria
Miskan	Persian Gulf	Kuwait
Misool	Raja Ampat Islands	Indonesia
Mistaken	Lake Abitibi, Ontario	Canada
Mitchell	Louisiana	United States
Mitchell Key	Louisiana	United States
Mitiaro	Cook Islands	Cook Islands
Mitkof	Alexander Archipelago, Alaska	United States
Mitraha	Lake Tana	Ethiopia
Miyakejima	Izu Islands	Japan
Miyakojima	Miyako Islands part of the Sakishima Islands part of the Ryukyu Islands	Japan
Mjältön	High Coast	Sweden
Mljet	Adriatic Sea	Croatia
Mo-do-Meio	Beira Litoral islands	Portugal
Mohácsi-sziget	Danube River	Hungary
Mohawk	Lake Erie, Ontario	Canada
Mohéli	Comoros	Comoros
Mohni	Gulf of Finland	Estonia
Moho Tani	Marquesas Islands	French Polynesia
Île-aux-Moines	Gulf of Morbihan	France
Moínho	Alentejo islands	Portugal
Mokoia	Lake Rotorua	New Zealand
Molara		Italy
Molène	Archipel de Molène	France
Molokaʻi	Hawaii	United States
Møn		Denmark
Moneron	Strait of Tartary, Sakhalin Oblast	Russia
Monhegan	Maine	United States
Monkey	Louisiana	United States
Monocanock	Susquehanna River, Pennsylvania	United States
Monomoy	Massachusetts	United States
Mont Saint-Michel	Normandy	France
Monte Branco	Alentejo islands	Portugal
Monte Farinha	Beira Litoral islands	Portugal
Montecristo	Tuscan Archipelago	Italy
Montreal	Hochelaga Archipelago	Canada
Montserrat	Leeward Islands of the Lesser Antilles	Overseas territory of the United Kingdom
Monument	Shepherd Islands	Vanuatu
Moodie	Nunavut	Canada
Moon	Georgian Bay Ontario	Canada
Moorea	Windward Islands, Society Islands, French Polynesia	Overseas Lands of France
Mopelia	Windward Islands, Society Islands, French Polynesia	Overseas Lands of France
Moresby	Haida Gwaii, British Columbia	Canada
Morfil	River Senegal	Senegal
Morgan	Louisiana	United States
Morraceira	Beira Litoral islands	Portugal
Morris	Charleston Harbor, South Carolina	United States
Mors	Limfjorden	Denmark
Mortland	Illinois River, Illinois	United States
Moruroa	Tuamotus, French Polynesia	France
Moscos Islands	Tanintharyi Region	Burma
Mosenthein	Mississippi River, Illinois	United States
Moser	Mississippi River, Missouri	United States
Moskenesøya	Lofoten	Norway
Moso	Shepherd Islands	Vanuatu
Mosterøy	Stavanger Municipality, Ryfylke Islands, Rogaland county	Norway
Mota	Banks Islands	Vanuatu
Mota Lava	Banks Islands	Vanuatu
Motiti	Bay of Plenty	New Zealand
Motu One	Windward Islands, Society Islands, French Polynesia	Overseas Lands of France
Motuihe	Hauraki Gulf	New Zealand
Motukaramarama	Motukawao Islands, Hauraki Gulf	New Zealand
Moturata	Mouth of the Taieri River	New Zealand
Moturua	Motukawao Islands, Hauraki Gulf	New Zealand
Motutapu	Hauraki Gulf	New Zealand
Motuwi	Motukawao Islands, Hauraki Gulf	New Zealand
Moucha		Djibouti
Moul of Eswick	Shetland Islands	Scotland
Mount Ao	Zhoushan Archipelago	China
Mount Desert	Maine	United States
Mount Maji	Zhoushan Archipelago	China
Mousa	Shetland Islands	Scotland
Mouse	Bermuda	Bermuda
Mouse	Lake Erie, Ohio	United States
Moutoa	Whanganui River	New Zealand
Mowat	Georgian Bay (Parry Sound), Ontario	Canada
Muck	Inner Hebrides	Scotland
Muckle Green Holm	The North Isles, Orkney Islands	Scotland
Muckle Flugga	Shetland Islands	Scotland
Muckle Ossa	Shetland Islands	Scotland
Muckle Roe	Shetland Islands	Scotland
Mud	Detroit River, Michigan	United States
Mud Grass	Louisiana	United States
Mud Island Shoal	Delaware River, Pennsylvania	United States
Muharraq	Persian Gulf	Bahrain
Muhu	West Estonian archipelago; Baltic Sea	Estonia
Isla Mujeres	Caribbean, Quintana Roo	Mexico
Muifuiva	Haʻapai	Tonga
Mukawwar		Sudan
Mulberry	James River, Virginia	United States
Mull	Inner Hebrides	Scotland
Mumfort	York River, Virginia	United States
Murano	Venetian Lagoon, Veneto	Italy
Murphy	Allegheny River, Pennsylvania	United States
Murray	Torres Strait Islands, Queensland	Australia
Murry	Thousand Islands, New York	United States
Murter	Adriatic Sea	Croatia
Musholm	Islands of the Great Belt	Denmark
Muskeget	Massachusetts	United States
Muskingum	Ohio River, West Virginia	United States
Mussau	St. Matthias Islands	Papua New Guinea
Mussel Rock	California	United States
Mustang	Port Aransas, Texas	United States
Mustapha	Ohio River, West Virginia	United States
Myingun Island	Rakhine State	Burma
Mykines	Faroe Islands	Denmark
Mykonos	Cyclades	Greece

== See also ==
- List of islands (by country)
- List of islands by area
- List of islands by population
- List of islands by highest point
