= List of shipwrecks in December 1848 =

The list of shipwrecks in December 1848 includes ships sunk, foundered, wrecked, grounded, or otherwise lost during December 1848.

== 1 December ==
List of shipwrecks: 1 December 1848
Ship	State	Description
Agnes	United Kingdom	The ship was wrecked on the Bemar Rock, off the coast of Fife. She was on a voyage from London to Alloa, Clackmannanshire. She was refloated on 12 December.
Albion	United Kingdom	The ship ran into Susan ( (United Kingdom of Great Britain and Ireland) Guernsey) and was abandoned in the North Sea off the coast of Norfolk. She subsequently ran onto the Scroby Sands and sank.
Argo	United Kingdom	The ship ran aground on the Blackwater Bank, in the Irish Sea. She was on a voyage from Liverpool, Lancashire to New Orleans, Louisiana, United States. She was refloated and resumed her voyage, but consequently put in to Kingstown, County Dublin before returning to Liverpool.
Brothers	United Kingdom	The ship was wrecked on the Gunfleet Sand, in the North Sea off the coast of Essex. Her crew were rescued. She was on a voyage from South Shields, County Durham to London.
Erbgrossherzog Friedrich Franz Wiesse	Grand Duchy of Mecklenburg-Schwerin	The ship was wrecked between Helsingør, Denmark and the Kullen Lighthouse, Sweden. She was on a voyage from Sunderland, County Durham to Ribnitz.
Friends	United Kingdom	The ship was driven ashore near Cellardyke, Fife. Her crew were rescued. She was on a voyage from Perth to the Clyde.
Henrietta	United States	The barque was wrecked on the Cow and Calf Rocks, off the coast of County Cork, United Kingdom. Her crew were rescued. She was on a voyage from Cobh, County Cork to Cardiff, Glamorgan, United Kingdom.
Hiram	United Kingdom	The ship was holed by her anchor and sank at Memel, Prussia. She was on a voyage from Dublin to Memel. She was refloated the next day.
Joseph Haydn	Bremen	The ship ran aground in the Geeste.
Juventus	United Kingdom	The brig ran aground on the Gunfleet Sand, in the North Sea off the coast of Essex. Her crew were rescued by HMRC Scout ( Board of Customs). Juventus was refloated the next day and towed in to Harwich, Essex in a derelict condition.
Lahorieux	France	The ship struck a sunken rock and was damaged. She was on a voyage from Nantes, Loire-Inférieure to an English port. She was refloated and put in to Abrevach, Finistère.
Oreste	United Kingdom	The ship departed from Constantinople, Ottoman Empire for a British port. No further trace, presumed foundered with the loss of all hands.
Peak	United Kingdom	The ship was driven ashore at Harwich. She was on a voyage from Whitby, Yorkshire to Harwich. She was refloated.
Penelope	(United Kingdom of Great Britain and Ireland) British North America	The ship departed from Sydney, Nova Scotia for New York, United States. No further trace, presumed foundered with the loss of all hands.
Rover	(United Kingdom of Great Britain and Ireland) British North America	The schooner was abandoned and set afire in the Grand Banks of Newfoundland (44°56′N 50°58′W). Her crew were rescued by Centurion (United Kingdom). Rover was on a voyage from Pictou, Nova Scotia to Saint John's, Newfoundland.
Speculateur	France	The sloop was wrecked on the Sunk Sand, in the North Sea off the coast of Essex. Her crew were rescued. She was on a voyage from Trouville-sur-Mer, Calvados to Ipswich, Suffolk, United Kingdom.
Speculation	United Kingdom	The ship was struck the South Rock and was damaged. She was on a voyage from Liverpool, Lancashire to Dublin. She put in to Donaghadee, County Antrim in a leaky condition.

== 2 December ==
List of shipwrecks: 2 December 1848
Ship	State	Description
Butterwick	United Kingdom	The brig was driven into the schooner Susan ( (United Kingdom of Great Britain and Ireland) Guernsey) and then drove onto the Scroby Sands, Norfolk and sank. Butterwick was on a voyage from Whitby, Yorkshire to Ramsgate, Kent.
Diana	(United Kingdom of Great Britain and Ireland) British North America	The ship was driven ashore and wrecked on Negro Island, Maine, United States. Her crew were rescued. She was on a voyage from Cornwallis, Nova Scotia to Portland, Maine.
Dorade	France	The ship was wrecked on a reef off Barbuda. Her crew were rescued. She was on a voyage from Martinique to Havre de Grâce, Seine-Inférieure.
Eliza	United Kingdom	The ship was driven ashore and wrecked on Watchman's Cape, Patagonia, Argentina. Her crew were rescued.
Mervin	United Kingdom	The ship ran aground on the Cork Sand, in the North Sea off the coast of Essex. She was on a voyage from South Shields, County Durham to London. She was refloated the next day and taken in to Harwich, Essex in a leaky condition. She was beached there.
Roseau	United Kingdom	The ship ran aground on the Goswick Sand Ridge, in the North Sea off the coast of Northumberland. She was on a voyage from Dundee, Forfarshire to Hartlepool, County Durham. She was refloated on 8 December and resumed her voyage.

== 3 December ==
List of shipwrecks: 3 December 1848
Ship	State	Description
City of Limerick	United Kingdom	The schooner was driven ashore on the mainland opposite Isleornsay, Isle of Skye, Outer Hebrides and north of the entrance to Loch Horne. She caught fire and sank. Her crew were rescued. She was on a voyage from Liverpool, Lancashire to Newcastle upon Tyne, Northumberland.
Fate	United Kingdom	The brig was in collision with Glenalbyn (United Kingdom) and sank in the North Sea 5 nautical miles (9.3 km) north of Flamborough Head, Yorkshire. Her crew were rescued. She was on a voyage from Hartlepool, County Durham to King's Lynn, Norfolk.
Goose	United Kingdom	The brigantine was in collision with Osprey (United Kingdom) and sank in the North Sea 4 leagues (12 nautical miles (22 km)) south of Spurn Point, Yorkshire. Her crew were rescued by Osprey. Goose was on a voyage from Newcastle upon Tyne, Northumberland to London.
Hannah	(United Kingdom of Great Britain and Ireland) Guernsey	The ship ran aground on the Sizewell Bank, in the North Sea off the coast of Suffolk. She was refloated and put in to Great Yarmouth, Norfolk in a leaky condition.
Hannah Quist	United Kingdom	The ship was wrecked on "Steinsnaes". She was on a voyage from London to Løgstør, Denmark.
John	United Kingdom	The ship struck a rock and sank in the River Avon. Her crew were rescued. She was refloated on 5 December.
John Carver	United States	The barque was driven ashore in Widewall Bay. She was refloated.
Kilmaurs	United Kingdom	The ship departed from Matanzas, Cuba for Cork. No further trace, presumed foundered with the loss of all hands.
Mosea	Spain	The schooner was wrecked in the Saltee Islands, County Wexford. Her crew were rescued. She was on a voyage from Villagatia to Cork.
Olive Branch	United Kingdom	The ship was driven ashore at "Huddlethorpe", Lincolnshire.
Providence	United Kingdom	The paddle tug ran aground and sank at Hendon, County Durham.
Rosseau	United Kingdom	The ship ran aground on the Goswick Sand Ridge, in the North Sea off the coast of Northumberland. She was on a voyage from Dundee, Forfarshire to Hartlepool, County Durham.

== 4 December ==
List of shipwrecks: 4 December 1848
Ship	State	Description
Active	United Kingdom	The schooner was driven ashore and wrecked in Freshwick Bay with the loss of three of her seven crew. She was on a voyage from Newcastle upon Tyne, Northumberland to Dublin.
Apthorpe	United Kingdom	The ship was driven ashore in Cloudular Bay, County Clare. She had been refloated by 8 December and taken in to Tarbert, Argyllshire.
Ceres	Denmark	The ship was run aground off Aså. She was on a voyage from Newcastle upon Tyne to Gothenburg, Sweden. She was refloated and put in to Fredrikshavn.
Devonshire	United Kingdom	The ship was driven ashore at Kilrush, County Clare.
Ellen	United Kingdom	The brig ran aground in the Pakefield Gat, in the North Sea off the coast of Suffolk. She was on a voyage from Middlesbrough, Yorkshire to London. She was refloated and resumed her voyage.
Margaret Sophia	United Kingdom	The brig ran aground in the Pakefield Gat and was damaged. She was on a voyage from Middlesbrough to London. She was refloated and taken into Lowestoft, Suffolk in a leaky condition.
Osprey	United Kingdom	The ship ran aground at Lowestoft. She was on a voyage from Kirkcaldy, Fife to London. She was refloated and taken in to Lowestoft.
Ury	United Kingdom	The schooner was wrecked on the Barnard Sand, in the North Sea off the coast of Norfolk with the loss of three of her five crew. Survivors were rescued by the Southwold Lifeboat. She was on a voyage from Sunderland, County Durham to Dunkirk, Nord, France.
William and Helen, or William and Henry	United Kingdom	The schooner ran aground on the Newcombe Sand, in the North Sea off the coast of Suffolk. She put in to Great Yarmouth, Norfolk in a leaky condition.
Zion's Hope	United Kingdom	The ship ran aground on the St. Nicholas Bank, in the North Sea. She was on a voyage from Stettin to London. She was refloated and taken in to Great Yarmouth.

== 5 December ==
List of shipwrecks: 5 December 1848
Ship	State	Description
John and Eliza	United Kingdom	The ship was driven ashore on Oversay, Renfrewshire. She floated off and sank. Her crew were rescued.
Marianne	Spain	The ship was driven ashore and sank at Kingswear Castle, Devon, United Kingdom. Her crew were rescued. She was on a voyage from Vigo to Dartmouth, Devon.

== 6 December ==
List of shipwrecks: 6 December 1848
Ship	State	Description
Catharina	Netherlands	The ship foundered in the Dogger Bank. Her crew were rescued. She was on a voyage from Amsterdam, North Holland to Whitby, Yorkshire, United Kingdom.
Magdalena	Hamburg	The ship ran aground on the Klein Vogel Sand, in the North Sea and sank with the loss of all but one of her crew. She was on a voyage from Newcastle upon Tyne, Northumberland, United Kingdom to Hamburg.
Mosca	United Kingdom	The ship was wrecked near Wexford. She was on a voyage from "Villagatea" to Cork.
Osprey	United Kingdom	The ship was driven ashore near Whitehaven, Cumberland. She was on a voyage from New Quay, Cardiganshire to Barrow-in-Furness, Lancashire. She was refloated on 11 December and taken in to Whitehaven.

== 7 December ==
List of shipwrecks: 7 December 1848
Ship	State	Description
Dispatch	United Kingdom	The ship was driven ashore near Lenny Head, Pembrokeshire with the loss of all but one of her crew. She was on a voyage from Prince Edward Island, British North America to Bideford, Devon.
Magdalena	Hamburg	The ship ran aground and sank on the Klein Vogelsand, in the North Sea with the loss of all but one of her crew. She was on a voyage from Newcastle upon Tyne, Northumberland, United Kingdom to Hamburg.
Philantrope	France	The ship was wrecked on the Colorados, off the coast of Cuba. She was on a voyage from New Orleans, Louisiana, United States to Havre de Grâce, Seine-Inférieure.
Rose	United Kingdom	The smack was in collision with New Draper and sank off St. Bees Head, Cumberland. Her crew were rescued by New Draper. Rose was on a voyage from Dumfries to London.

== 8 December ==
List of shipwrecks: 8 December 1848
Ship	State	Description
Eleven	United Kingdom	The ship was driven ashore on Tenedos, Ottoman Empire. She was on a voyage from Odesa to Cork or Falmouth, Cornwall. She was refloated on 16 December and resumed her voyage.
Jane	United Kingdom	The ship was in collision with Barrow (United Kingdom) and was damaged. She put in to Ramsey, Isle of Man in a sinking condition.
Illyrian	United Kingdom	The ship was driven ashore at Porth y Pistill, Caernarfonshire. She was on a voyage from Richibucto, New Brunswick, British North America to Liverpool, Lancashire.

== 9 December ==
List of shipwrecks: 9 December 1848
Ship	State	Description
Adolph	United Kingdom	The ship was driven ashore at Helsingør, Denmark. She was later refloated and resumed her voyage.
Don Colino	United Kingdom	The ship was driven ashore at Redcar, Yorkshire. She was on a voyage from Hartlepool, County Durham to Guernsey, Channel Islands. She was refloated and put back to Hartlepool.
Illyria	(United Kingdom of Great Britain and Ireland) British North America	The schooner was driven ashore near Holyhead, Anglesey. She was on a voyage from Richibucto, New Brunswick to Liverpool, Lancashire. She was refloated on 7 January 1849 and taken in to Holyhead.
John	United Kingdom	The flat sank in the River Lune. Her crew were rescued. She was on a voyage from Liverpool, Lancashire to Lancaster, Lancashire.
John	Sweden	The ship was driven ashore and severely damaged on Bornholm, Denmark. She was on a voyage from the Mediterranean to Karlskrona. She was refloated and taken in to Rønne, Denmark. f
London	United Kingdom	The ship ran aground on a reef off Matanzas, Cuba. She was on a voyage from New Orleans, Louisiana, United States to Liverpool.
Ocean Queen	United Kingdom	The ship was wrecked on a reef off "Linguin". All on board were rescued. She was on a voyage from Singapore to London.
York	(United Kingdom of Great Britain and Ireland) New South Wales	The schooner foundered off Port Phillip.

== 10 December ==
List of shipwrecks: 10 December 1848
Ship	State	Description
Brothers	United Kingdom	The ship was driven ashore near Walmer Castle, Kent.
Eugenia	(United Kingdom of Great Britain and Ireland) Gibraltar	The ship was wrecked at Madeira. Her crew were rescued. She was on a voyage from Gibraltar to Madeira.
Kronprincessin	Sweden	The ship was driven ashore on the coast of Cateret County, North Carolina United States with the loss of two of her crew. She was on a voyage from Stockholm to New York, United States.
Senhor dos Passos	Portugal	The ship was wrecked at Madeira. Her crew were rescued. She was on a voyage from Demerara, British Guiana to Madeira.
Sir James McDonald	United Kingdom	The ship sprang a leak and subsequently struck the Hen and Chickens Rocks, in Buzzards Bay. She was beached on Cuttyhunk Island, Massachusetts, where she became a wreck. Sir James McDonald was on a voyage from New York, United States to Cork.
Tamar	United Kingdom	The schooner struck a sunken rock and foundered in the North Sea off Scarborough, Yorkshire. Her crew were rescued. She was on a voyage from Middlesbrough, Yorkshire to Boston, Lincolnshire.

== 11 December ==
List of shipwrecks: 11 December 1848
Ship	State	Description
Ann Paley	United Kingdom	The brig was driven ashore and wrecked near Tacumshane, County Wexford with the loss of seven of her ten crew. She was on a voyage from Lisbon, Portugal to Liverpool, Lancashire.
Aquilas	(United Kingdom of Great Britain and Ireland) Jersey	The ship was wrecked at São Miguel Island, Azores with the loss of a crew member.
Excel	United Kingdom	The ship was wrecked at São Miguel Island.
General Washington	United States	The ship ran aground on the Longsand, in the North Sea off the coast of Essex, United Kingdom. She was on a voyage from Bremen to New Orleans, Louisiana. She was refloated and resumed her voyage.
Mellona	United Kingdom	The ship was driven ashore east of Rye, Sussex. She was on a voyage from Newcastle upon Tyne, Northumberland to Jersey, Channel Islands. She was refloated and resumed her voyage.
Pictou	United Kingdom	The ship was wrecked at Galley Head, County Cork. Her crew were rescued. She was on a voyage from Boston, Massachusetts, United States to London.
Pomona	United Kingdom	The ship was driven ashore 4 nautical miles (7.4 km) south of Bridlington, East Riding of Yorkshire. She was on a voyage from Newcastle upon Tyne, Northumberland to Rotterdam, South Holland. She was refloated and resumed her voyage.
Sarah Jackson	United Kingdom	The ship was severely damaged by fire at Limerick.

== 12 December ==
List of shipwrecks: 12 December 1848
Ship	State	Description
Albion	United Kingdom	The smack was wrecked near Newton Point, Glamorgan with the loss of three of her crew.
Althorp	United States	The ship was wrecked on the Alacranes Reef. She was on a voyage from Hamburg to Veracruz, Mexico.
Dartagnan	France	The lugger was driven ashore and wrecked in Tramore Bay. Her six crew were rescued. She was on a voyage from Nantes, Loire-Inférieure to Waterford, United Kingdom. Subsequently repaired and rebuilt as the brigantine Mary Jane (United Kingdom, which was lost on 15 February 1852.
Elizabeth	United Kingdom	The ship was driven ashore at Anderby, Lincolnshire. She was refloated and taken in to Hull, Yorkshire.
Golden Eagle	United Kingdom	The ship was driven ashore at Crookhaven, County Cork. She was on a voyage from Nassau, Bahamas to Liverpool, Lancashire. She was refloated and beached for repairs.
Mariner	United Kingdom	The ship was driven ashore and wrecked at "Ordaah", 100 nautical miles (190 km) west of Trebizond, Ottoman Empire.

== 13 December ==
List of shipwrecks: 13 December 1848
Ship	State	Description
Anna Meta	Hamburg	The ship was driven ashore on Scharhörn. She was refloated and taken in to Cuxhaven.
Falcon	United Kingdom	The schooner was driven ashore at Ballycotton, County Antrim with the loss of one of her five crew. Survivors were rescued by the Coast Guard. She was on a voyage from Glasgow, Renfrewshire to Cork.
Gleaner	United Kingdom	The ship ran aground on the Cross Sand, in the North Sea off the coast of Norfolk. She was on a voyage from Kronstadt, Russia to Bordeaux, Gironde, France. She was refloated and anchored off Winterton-on-Sea, Norfolk.
Growler	United Kingdom	The brig was wrecked in Whiting Bay, County Cork. Her crew survived. She was on a voyage from New York, United States to Waterford.
Isabella	United Kingdom	The sloop departed from Aberdeen for Lerwick, Shetland Islands. No further trace, presumed foundered with the loss of all hands.
Leucothea	Prussia	The ship ran aground on the Cosserow Reef, off "Veneta". She was refloated. She was on a voyage from Gloucester, United Kingdom to Pillau.
Magnet	United Kingdom	The schooner ran aground on the Newcombe Sand, in the North Sea off the coast of Suffolk. She was on a voyage from Sunderland, County Durham to Calais, France. She was refloated and taken in to Lowestoft, Suffolk.
Neptune	France	The lugger was wrecked on the Brest Rock. Her crew were rescued. She was on a voyage from Dublin to Troon, Ayrshire, United Kingdom.
Peggy	United Kingdom	The sloop foundered off Troon. Her crew were rescued. She was on a voyage from Belfast, County Antrim to Irvine, Ayrshire.

== 14 December ==
List of shipwrecks: 14 December 1848
Ship	State	Description
Anna Meta	United Kingdom	The ship was driven ashore on Scharhörn. She was on a voyage from Hartlepool, County Durham, United Kingdom to Hamburg. She was refloated and taken in to Cuxhaven.
Ann Wise	United Kingdom	The ship was driven ashore in Casguinny Bay, County Cork.
Dart	United Kingdom	The ship was driven ashore at Saltfleet, Lincolnshire. Her crew were rescued. She was on a voyage from Seville, Spain to Hull, Yorkshire.
Duquit	United Kingdom	The ship was wrecked in Courtmahoney Bay, County Cork.
General Scott	United Kingdom	The brig was driven ashore in Morrison's Bay, County Cork.
George	United Kingdom	The ship was driven ashore near Hubberstone, Pembrokeshire.
Hero	(United Kingdom of Great Britain and Ireland) New Zealand	The ship was wrecked at Cape Campbell.
Hong Kong	United Kingdom	The ship departed from Havana, Cuba for Cork. No further trace, presumed foundered with the loss of all hands.
La Jeune	France	The lugger was driven ashore and wrecked in Tramore Bay. She was on a voyage from Nantes, Loire-Inférieure to Waterford.
Mary	United Kingdom	The barque was run down and sunk off Cleeness, Lincolnshire by the steamship Duke of Buccleuch (United Kingdom). Her seven crew survived. She was on a voyage from South Shields, County Durham to London
Mermaid	United Kingdom	The ship was driven ashore in the Menai Strait at "Tuecastle", Anglesey. She was on a voyage from Liverpool, Lancashire to Caernarfon.
Nina	United Kingdom	The ship was destroyed by fire in the Atlantic Ocean. Her crew took to the boats; they were rescued on 23 December. She was on a voyage from Coquimbo, Chile to Liverpool.
Nonantum	United Kingdom	The ship ran aground on the Casking Bank, off the coast of County Cork.
Nonpareil	United Kingdom	The brigantine was wrecked at Oysterhaven, County Cork with the loss of all hnds.
Ocean	United Kingdom	The ship was wrecked on the Kentish Knock. Her crew were rescued by HMRC Scout ( Board of Customs ). Ocean was on a voyage from Newcastle upon Tyne, Northumberland to Havre de Grâce, Seine-Inférieure, France.
Reaper	United Kingdom	The ship was driven ashore on the coast of County Cork.
Rose	United Kingdom	The pilot cutter sank at Cork.
Saguenay	United Kingdom	The ship was abandoned in the Atlantic Ocean. Twenty-one crew were rescued by Forest King (United Kingdom).
HMS Sharpshooter	Royal Navy	The Sharpshooter-class gunvessel ran aground off Worthing, Sussex. She was refloated the next day.
Thomas and Edward	United Kingdom	The schooner was driven ashore in Kitchen Cove, County Cork. She was on a voyage from Cork to Liverpool.
Tourville	France	The brigantine was driven ashore in Tramore Bay. Her crew were rescued. She was on a voyage from Nantes to Waterford.
William	United Kingdom	The ship was run into by the steamship Bold Bucchleugh (United Kingdom) and sank off Grimsby, Lincolnshire. Her crew were rescued. She was on a voyage from South Shields to London.

== 15 December ==
List of shipwrecks: 15 December 1848
Ship	State	Description
Alert	United Kingdom	The ship was driven ashore in the Small Isles, Inner Hebrides. She was on a voyage from Inverness to the Isle of Man.
Alexander	United Kingdom	The ship ran aground in the River Suir.
Ann	United Kingdom	The ship was driven ashore in Loch Indaal. She was on a voyage from Workington, Cumberland to Hamilton, Lanarkshire.
Ann	United Kingdom	The ship was driven ashore in Loch Indaal. She was on a voyage from Glasgow, Renfrewshire to Limerick.
Anna Maria	United Kingdom	The sloop was driven into the sloop John and Jean (United Kingdom) and was damaged at Dundee, Forfarshire.
Annie	United Kingdom	The flat sank in the River Mersey off Tranmere, Cheshire. Her crew were rescued.
Armour	United Kingdom	The ship was driven ashore in the Small Isles, off Jura.
Bayonne	France	The ship was wrecked in Clonakilty Bay.
Bee	United Kingdom	The barque was driven ashore and wrecked near Annalong, County Antrim with the loss of one of her 21 crew. Survivors were rescued by the Coast Guard using rocket apparatus. She was on a voyage from Liverpool, Lancashire to New Orleans, Louisiana, United States.
Beehive	United Kingdom	The ship was driven ashore at Inverkeithing, Fife. She had been refloated by 18 December.
Belle	(United Kingdom of Great Britain and Ireland) British North America	The brig was driven ashore and wrecked at Douglas, Isle of Man. Her crew were rescued. She was on a voyage from Liverpool to Swansea, Glamorgan.
Betsy	United Kingdom	The smack sank at Little Mill, Isle of Arran.
Betty Jane	United Kingdom	The pilot boat capsized off Cooley Point, County Louth with the loss of five of the six people on board.
Bonne Marie	France	The ship was wrecked on Mason Island, or Mace Head, County Galway, United Kingdom. Her four crew were rescued. She was on a voyage from Nantes, Loire-Inférieure to Galway.
Bridges	United Kingdom	The ship was driven ashore in the Small Isles.
Brilliant	United Kingdom	The ship was driven ashore near Fowey, Cornwall. She was on a voyage from Antwerp, Belgium to Bristol, Gloucestershire.
Christian	United Kingdom	The ship foundered off Tarbet, Inverness-shire. Her crew were rescued. She was on a voyage from Ardrossan, Ayrshire to Londonderry.
Dahlia	United Kingdom	The ship was driven ashore at Inverkeiting. She had been refloated by 19 December.
David	United Kingdom	The ship was wrecked near Clonakilty, County Cork. She was on a voyage from Bayonne, Basses-Pyrénées, France to Waterford.
Derwent	United Kingdom	The ship was driven ashore in Loch Indaal. She was on a voyage from Sligo to Belfast, County Antrim.
Dublin	United Kingdom	The ship was driven ashore at Inverkeiting. She had been refloated by 19 December.
Duguet	France	The brig was driven ashore at Courtmacsherry, County Cork, with the loss of one of her nine crew. She was on a voyage from Bordeaux, Gironde to Liverpool.
Eagle	United Kingdom	The ship was driven ashore in Loch Indaal. She was on a voyage from the Clyde to Westport, County Mayo.
Edward and James	United Kingdom	The ship was driven ashore on the coast of County Antrim. She was on a voyage from Liverpool to Glenarm, County Antrim.
Ellen	United Kingdom	The ship ran aground off "Lilla Biddinges", near Ystad, Sweden. She was on a voyage from Riga, Russia to Hull, Yorkshire.
Emalia	United Kingdom	The ship was driven ashore and wrecked at Bannow, County Wexford with the loss of fourteen lives.
Findhorn Packet	United Kingdom	The sloop departed from Peterhead, Aberdeenshire for Cullen, Morayshire. No further trace, presumed foundered with the loss of both crew.
Free Trader	United Kingdom	The brig was wrecked near Clonakilty. Her nine crew were rescued by Dennett's rocket apparatus. She was on a voyage from Galaţi, Ottoman Empire to Sligo.
Fuchsia	United Kingdom	The ship was driven ashore at Inverkeithing, Fife. She was on a voyage from Glasgow to Newcastle upon Tyne. She was refloated and taken in to Inverkeithing for repairs.
Garmoyle Lightship	Trinity House	The lightship foundered in the Firth of Clyde. All four people on board survived.
Guardian	United Kingdom	The ship was driven ashore in the Small Isles.
Hannah	United Kingdom	The ship was driven ashore and severely damaged at Oban, Argyllshire. She was on a voyage from Wick, Caithness to Liverpool.
Hawthorn	United Kingdom	The brig ran aground on the Kentish Knock. She was on a voyage from Sunderland, County Durham to Portsmouth, Hampshire. She was refloated and taken in to Harwich, Essex in a leaky condition.
Helen	United Kingdom	The ship was driven ashore in the Small Isles.
Henry Turner	United Kingdom	The ship was driven ashore at Penmon, Anglesey. She was on a voyage from Liverpool to Newry, County Antrim.
Herald	United Kingdom	The ship was driven ashore in Loch Indaal. She was on a voyage from Glasgow to Limerick.
Hope	United Kingdom	The ship sank at Carrickfergus. Her crew were rescued.
Incentive	United Kingdom	The ship was driven ashore at Angle, Pembrokeshire.
Industry	United Kingdom	The ship was driven ashore and severely damaged on Inchgarvie, Fife. She was on a voyage from Burntisland to Leven. She was refloated on 21 December and taken in to Inverkeithing, Fife.
James	United Kingdom	The smack was driven ashore at Whiteabbey, County Antrim. Her crew were rescued. She had been refloated by 19 December.
James Clarke	United Kingdom	The ship was driven ashore at Larne, County Antrim. She was on a voyage from Sligo to Liverpool. She was refloated on 26 December and taken in to Belfast for repairs.
Jane	United Kingdom	The ship was driven ashore at Whiteabbey. Her crew were rescued. She was on a voyage from Ardrossan, Ayrshire to Liverpool, Lancashire.
Jane	United Kingdom	The ship was driven ashore at Carrickfergus, County Antrim. Her crew were rescued. She was on a voyage from Preston, Lancashire to Dublin. She was refloated on 29 December and towed in to Belfast, County Antrim for repairs.
Jane and Ann	United Kingdom	The ship was driven ashore near Montrose, Forfarshire.
Jessie	United Kingdom	The sloop was driven ashore and severely damaged at Easdale, Argyllshire. She was consequently condemned.
Jessie Cumming	United Kingdom	The ship was driven ashore in Loch Indaal.
John and Jean	United Kingdom	The sloop was into by the sloop Anna Maria (United Kingdom) and was then driven against the quayside and severely damaged at Dundee. Her captain, the only person on board, was rescued by Anna Maria.
John and Mary	United Kingdom	The ship was driven ashore at Inverkeiting. She had been refloated by 19 December.
King of the Forest	United Kingdom	The schooner was driven ashore at Ardagh, County Cork. She was on a voyage from Marseille, Bouches-du-Rhône, France to Cork. She was driven further ashore on 3 January 1849. King of the Forest was refloated on 11 January and taken in to Glandore, County Cork.
Liberty	United Kingdom	The brig was abandoned in Laggan Bay. Her crew were rescued. She was on a voyage from Limerick to Glasgow, Renfrewshire.
Margaret and Jane	United Kingdom	The sloop sank at Dundee.
Martin	United Kingdom	The ship was driven ashore in Loch Indaal. She was on a voyage from Islay, Inner Hebrides to the Clyde.
Mary Kerr	United Kingdom	The ship was driven ashore in Loch Indaal. She was on a voyage from Hamilton to Liverpool.
Matilda McColl	United Kingdom	The ship was driven ashore at Easdale.
Maxwell	United Kingdom	The schooner was driven ashore and severely damaged at Dundee.
Medora	United Kingdom	The ship was driven ashore in the Small Isles.
Mentor	United Kingdom	The schooner was wrecked in Dunebogy Cove, County Cork with the loss of all six of her crew. She was on a voyage from Great Yarmouth, Norfolk to Palermo, Sicily.
Nancy	United Kingdom	The ship was holed by her anchor and sank at Whitby, Yorkshire.
Ocean	United Kingdom	The ship was driven ashore at Inverkeiting. She had been refloated by 19 December.
Pandora	United Kingdom	The ship was driven ashore between Ballycotton and "Ballycrina", County Cork with the loss of all hands. The ship's dog survived.
Petrel	United Kingdom	The ship was driven ashore in Loch Indaal. She was on a voyage from the Clyde to Sligo.
Princess	(United Kingdom of Great Britain and Ireland) British North America	The ship was driven ashore in Loch Indaal. She was on a voyage from Saint John, New Brunswick to Ballyshannon, County Donegal. She was refloated on 26 December.
Roderick	United Kingdom	The ship was driven ashore and wrecked at Easdale with the loss of all four crew.
Ruby	United Kingdom	The ship was driven ashore at Larne, County Antrim.
Severn	United Kingdom	The barque was driven ashore near Courtmacsherry, County Cork with the loss of two of her seventeen crew. Survivors were rescued by Dennett's rocket apparatus.
Sir William	United Kingdom	The ship was driven ashore at Carrickfergus. She was on a voyage from Preston to Dublin.
Sisters	United Kingdom	The ship was driven ashore and sank at Limekilns, Fife. She was on a voyage from Alloa, Clackmannanshire to Dunbar, Lothian.
Sovereign	United Kingdom	The barque was driven ashore and wrecked at Howestrand, County Cork with the loss of eleven of her fifteen crew. She was on a voyage from an American port to London.
St. Anne	United Kingdom	The schooner was driven ashore and wrecked at Glandore.
St. George	United Kingdom	The ship was driven ashore at Carrickfergus. She was on a voyage from Boston, Massachusetts to Dublin.
Surprise	United Kingdom	The ship was driven ashore in the Small Isles.
Thames	United Kingdom	The ship was driven ashore at Crosby Point, Lancashire. Her crew were rescued. She was on a voyage from Bridgwater, Somerset to Liverpool. She was refloated on 26 December and taken in to Liverpool.
Trader	United Kingdom	The ship was abandoned in the North Sea off Inchcape. Her three crew survived.
Triumph	United Kingdom	The ship was driven ashore at Inverkeiting. She had been refloated by 19 December.
Union	(United Kingdom of Great Britain and Ireland) British North America	The ship was driven ashore at Brankley Point, Prince Edward Island. She was refloated but drove ashore on Harrington Island and was consequently condemned. She was on a voyage from Rustico, Prince Edward Island to Trois-Rivières, Province of Canads.
Victoria	United Kingdom	The ship ran aground in the River Suir.
Wilkinson	United Kingdom	The ship was driven ashore at Newtownards, County Down.
William McFie	United Kingdom	The ship was driven ashore in Loch Indaal.

== 16 December ==
List of shipwrecks: 16 December 1848
Ship	State	Description
Amity	United Kingdom	The ship was driven ashore and wrecked on Colonsay, Inner Hebrides. She was on a voyage from Africa to Liverpool, Lancashire.
Bonnelina Mean	France	The ship was driven ashore and damaged at the Mumbles, Glamorgan, United Kingdom. She was on a voyage from Cardiff, Glamorgan to Nantes, Loire-Inférieure.
Clydesdale	United Kingdom	The ship was driven ashore and wrecked near Port Askaig with some loss of life.
Galathea	Hamburg	The ship was driven ashore and damaged at Tananger, Norway.
Goethe	Bremen	The ship was driven ashore in the Weser downstream of Weddewarden. She was on a voyage from Baltimore, Maryland, United States to Bremen. She was refloated the next day and taken in to Weddewarden.
Grace Darling	United Kingdom	The barque was driven ashore and wrecked at Green Castle, County Down. She was on a voyage from New York City, United States to Newry, County Antrim. She was refloated on 9 January 1849 and towed in to Londonderry.
Hebe	United Kingdom	The ship departed from the Isles of Scilly for São Miguel Island, Azores. No further trace, presumed foundered with the loss of all hands.
Julie	Hamburg	The ship was abandoned in the North Sea. Her crew were rescued by Theodosia (United Kingdom). Julia was on a voyage from Blankenese to Aberdeen, United Kingdom.
Juliet	United Kingdom	The brig foundered in the North Sea. Her crew were rescued by Harbinger (United Kingdom).
Kitty	United Kingdom	The ship was driven ashore and sank at the Mumbles. She was on a voyage from Newport, Monmouthshire to Youghal, County Cork. She was refloated.
Nancy	United Kingdom	The ship struck the pier, was holed by her anchor and sank at Whitby, Yorkshire.
Neptunus	United Kingdom	The brig ran aground off Höganäs, Sweden. She was on a voyage from Hull, Yorkshire to Raumo, Grand Duchy of Finland. She was later refloated and taken in to Helsingør, Denmark. She arrived on 22 December.
Norfolk	United Kingdom	The ship was wrecked on the Pye Sand, in the North Sea off the coast of Suffolk. Her crew were rescued. She was on a voyage from Southwold, Suffolk to London.
Phoenix	Flag unknown	The schooner was wrecked on the Shipwash Sand.
Pursuit	United Kingdom	The schooner foundered in the North Sea. Her crew were rescued by Harbinger (United Kingdom).
Roderick	United Kingdom	The ship was wrecked at Easdale, Argyllshire with the loss of all four crew.
Rosanna	United Kingdom	The barque struck a rock and foundered off Cape Wrath, Caithness with the loss of eleven of her twelve crew. Her captain survived. She was on a voyage from Liverpool to Newcastle upon Tyne.
Severn	United Kingdom	The barque was driven ashore and wrecked at Howth, County Dublin with the loss of two of her seventeen crew. Survivors were rescued by Dennett's rocket apparatus. She was on a voyage from Saint John's, Newfoundland, British North America to London.
Shannon	United Kingdom	The brig foundered in the North Sea off Whitby, Yorkshire. Her eleven crew were rescued by Isabella (United Kingdom). Shannon was on a voyage from Sunderland, County Durham to Portsmouth, Hampshire.
Susan	United Kingdom	The ship was driven ashore near Port Askaig, Islay, Inner Hebrides. She was on a voyage from Liverpool to Bahia, Brazil.
Union	United Kingdom	The ship was driven ashore and wrecked near Port Askaig with some loss of life.

== 17 December ==
List of shipwrecks: 17 December 1848
Ship	State	Description
Anna, and Blomidon	(United Kingdom of Great Britain and Ireland) Jersey; United Kingdom	The ships were in collision off Ilfracombe, Devon. Both vessels sank. Their crews were rescued.
Berenice	France	The ship was driven ashore in Courtmacsherry Bay, County Cork, United Kingdom with the loss of four of her crew. She was on a voyage from Havre de Grâce, Seine-Inférieure to Genoa, Kingdom of Sardinia.
Diadem	United Kingdom	The schooner ran aground near Inchkeith. Her crew were rescued. She was on a voyage from Stettin to London. She was refloated on 25 December and taken in to Kirkcaldy, Fife.
Fox	United Kingdom	The ship was driven ashore at Tobermory, Isle of Mull.
James Reed	United Kingdom	The ship foundered in the North Sea. Her crew were rescued by the brig Mosley (United Kingdom). James Reed was on a voyage from Riga, Russia to Montrose, Forfarshire.
Nonpareil	United Kingdom	The ship sprang a leak and sank off the Calf of Man, Isle of Man. Her crew were rescued. She was on a voyage from Newport, Monmouthshire to Liverpool, Lancashire.
Norfolk	United Kingdom	The ship ran aground and was wrecked on the Pye Sand, in the North Sea off the coast of Essex. She was on a voyage from Southwold, Suffolk to London.
Phoenix	Sweden	The ship was wrecked on the Baget Sand, in the North Sea off the coast of Essex. Her seven crew were rescued by the brig Maria Whitfield (United Kingdom). Phoenix was on a voyage from Stockholm to Nantes, Loire-Inférieure, France.
Royal George	United Kingdom	The barque foundered in Broad Sound with the loss of all hands.

== 18 December ==
List of shipwrecks: 18 December 1848
Ship	State	Description
Jeune Vincent	France	The ship was driven ashore and wrecked in Tramore Bay. Her crew were rescued. She was on a voyage from Bordeaux, Gironde to Cork, United Kingdom.
Lord Stanley	United Kingdom	The ship was driven ashore at Orford Haven, Suffolk.
Republic	United States	The full-rigged ship was wrecked on the Blackwater Bank, in the Irish Sea with the loss of two of her 21 crew. Survivors were rescued by two fishing boats. She was on a voyage from Liverpool, Lancashire, United Kingdom to Baltimore, Maryland.
Sarah	United Kingdom	The ship was wrecked on Cape Breton Island, Nova Scotia, British North America. Her crew were rescued. She was on a voyage from Nova Scotia to the Clyde.

== 19 December ==
List of shipwrecks: 19 December 1848
Ship	State	Description
Albion	United Kingdom	The ship ran aground on the Corton Sand, in the North Sea off the coast on Suffolk. She was on a voyage from Hamburg to Bristol, Gloucestershire.
Barbara	United Kingdom	The brig foundered at Fraserburgh, Aberdeenshire. Her crew were ashore at the time. She was on a voyage from Saint Petersburg, Russia to Sunderland, County Durham.
California	United States	The ship was driven ashore at Helsingør, Denmark. She was on a voyage from Vyborg, Grand Duchy of Finland to Bordeaux, Gironde, France.
Clyde	United Kingdom	The ship was wrecked at New Slains Castle, Aberdeenshire. She was on a voyage from Hamburg to Sunderland.
David	United Kingdom	The schooner was driven ashore and damaged at Fraserburgh.
James Clark	United Kingdom	The ship was driven ashore at Larne, County Antrim. She was on a voyage from Sligo to Liverpool, Lancashire. She was refloated on 26 December and taken in to Belfast, County Antrim for repairs.
Jock Howe	United Kingdom	The ship struck a sunken rock and was beached at Tobermory, Isle of Mull. She was on a voyage from Limerick to Bristol, Gloucestershire.
Little Queen	United Kingdom	The ship was abandoned off Waterford. She was a total loss.
Princess Royal	United Kingdom	The steamship ran aground in the Weser.
Susan	United Kingdom	The ship ran aground and was wrecked on the Sandhammer Reef, in the Baltic Sea. She was on a voyage from Saint Petersburg to London.

== 20 December ==
List of shipwrecks: 20 December 1848
Ship	State	Description
Albion	United Kingdom	The ship ran aground on the Corton Sand, in the North Sea off the coast of Suffolk. She was on a voyage from Hamburg to Bristol, Gloucestershire. She was refloated.
Ann and Susan	United Kingdom	The ship was driven ashore at Dublin. She was on a voyage from Glasgow, Renfrewshire to Bridgwater, Somerset and Milford Haven, Pembrokeshire. She was refloated the next day.
Argo	United Kingdom	The ship was driven ashore at Hartlepool, County Durham.
Brahams	Hamburg	The full-rigged ship was wrecked on the Pan Sand, in the North Sea off the coast of Kent, Ireland. All on board, more than 115 people, were rescued by two luggers. She was on a voyage from Hamburg to New Orleans, Louisiana, United States.
Brighton	United Kingdom	The brig was driven ashore and wrecked at Sunderland, County Durham.
Britannia	United Kingdom	The schooner was driven ashore at Sunderland. She was refloated on 28 December and taken in to Sunderland.
Christania	Norway	The ship was wrecked on the Haisborough Sands, in the North Sea off the coast of Norfolk, United Kingdom. She was on a voyage from Hamburg to Cádiz, Spain.
Columbine	United Kingdom	The barque was wrecked on the Blacktail Sand, in the North Sea. She was abandoned by her crew on 23 December. She was on a voyage from Stockton-on-Tees, County Durham to London.
Concordia	Kingdom of Hanover	The ship was wrecked near Emshörn, Her crew were rescued. She was on a voyage from Ditzum to London.
Cornellian	United Kingdom	The ship departed from Limerick for the Clyde. No further trace, presumed foundered with the loss of all hands.
Dove	United Kingdom	The ship was driven ashore at Hartlepool. She was refloated the next day and taken in to Hartlepool.
Elizabeth and Jane	United Kingdom	The brig was wrecked on the Maplin Sand, in the North Sea off the coast of Essex. She was on a voyage from Sunderland to London.
George and Charles	United Kingdom	The ship was driven ashore at Raphti, Greece. She was on a voyage from Limerick to Constantinople, Ottoman Empire.
Joseph and Elizabeth	United Kingdom	The ship sprang a leak and was beached on the Gunfleet Sand, in the North Sea off the coast of Essex, where she was wrecked. Her crew were rescued. She was on a voyage from Blyth, Northumberland to London.
Lady of the Isles	United Kingdom	The schooner was in collision with the schooner Marchioness of Bute (United Kingdom). She was taken in to by Marchioness of Bute until 22 December, when Hercules (United Kingdom) took her in tow. Lady of the Isles was subsequently abandoned; her crew were rescued by Hercules. She was on a voyage from Liverpool, Lancashire to Terceira Island, Azores. She was driven ashore at Ballyquin Point, County Waterford on 24 December. She was refloated on 26 December and taken in to Warrenpoint, County Antrim in a derelict condition.
Margaret	United Kingdom	The brig was wrecked at Aberdeen with the loss of her captain. She was on a voyage from Stockton-on-Tees, County Durham to Aberdeen.
Neptune	France	The chasse-marée was wrecked on the Breast Rock, off Girvan, Ayrshire, United Kingdom. Her crew were rescued. She was on a voyage from Dublin to Troon, Ayrshire.
Nicolene	Denmark	The schooner was wrecked on the Blacktail Sand, in the North Sea off the coast of Essex. She was refloated with the assistance of five smacks and assisted in to London.
Prince of Wales	United Kingdom	The ship was wrecked on the Gunfleet Sand. Her crew were rescued by HMRC Scout ( Board of Customs). Prince of Wales was on a voyage from Hamburg to London.
Shepherdess	United Kingdom	The ship was driven ashore and severely damaged in the Dardanelles. She was refloated.
Sophia	United Kingdom	The ship ran aground on the Foreness Rock, Margate, Kent. She was on a voyage from Gijón, Spain to London. She was refloated on 25 December and taken in to Margate.
Start	United Kingdom	The ship departed from Liverpool for Terceira Island, Azores. No further trace, presumed foundered with the loss of all hands.
Sylph	United Kingdom	The brig ran aground on the Pye Sand, in the North Sea off the coast of Essex. She was on a voyage from Newcastle upon Tyne, Northumberland to Thorpe-le-Soken, Essex.
Texian	United States	The ship ran aground on the Punta Arena Reef. She was on a voyage from Savanilla, Republic of New Granada to Liverpool.
Trimmer	United Kingdom	The sloop foundered in the North Sea 12 nautical miles (22 km) off Hartlepool. Her crew were rescued by Matura (United Kingdom). Trimmer was on a voyage from Whitby, Yorkshire to Sunderland.
Uomo Grazioto	Ottoman Empire	The ship was wrecked on the Dromore Bank, in the Irish Sea. Her crew were rescued.

== 21 December ==
List of shipwrecks: 21 December 1848
Ship	State	Description
Adastrus	United Kingdom	The brig foundered in the Mediterranean Sea off Crete. Her crew took to the boats, and were subsequently rescued by the brig Woodriffe (United Kingdom). Adastrus was on a voyage from Alexandria, Egypt to an English port.
Brarens	Hamburg	The ship was wrecked on the Tongue Sand, in the North Sea off the coast of Kent, United Kingdom. She was on a voyage from Hamburg to New York, United States.
David	United Kingdom	The ship ran aground on Skipness Point, Isle of Arran. She was refloated and towed in to Greenock, Renfrewshire in a severely damaged condition.
Frances Mary	United Kingdom	The ship was driven ashore at "Ballyvaloo", County Wexford.
Hope	United Kingdom	The ship was run down and sunk in the Irish Sea 30 nautical miles (56 km)) off Holyhead, Anglesey by Virginia (United States). Her crew were rescued by Lady Sale (United Kingdom). Hope was on a voyage from Liverpool, Lancashire to Bristol, Gloucestershire.
Johan Frederick	Rostock	The ship was wrecked on the Abertay Sands, in the North Sea off the mouth of the River Tay. Her crew were rescued. She was on a voyage from Memel, Prussia to Dundee, Forfarshire, United Kingdom and Buenos Aires, Argentina.
Leander	United Kingdom	The ship was lost at the entrance to the Bosphorus.
Margarets	United Kingdom	The ship struck the pier at Aberdeen and was wrecked with the loss of her captain.
Masernomo, or Musconomo	United States	The ship was damaged by fire at Liverpool, Lancashire, United Kingdom.
HMS Mutine	Royal Navy	The brig was driven ashore and wrecked at Chioggia, Kingdom of Lombardy–Venetia with the loss of five of her crew. Survivors were rescued by HMS Ardent (Royal Navy).
Saxon	United Kingdom	The ship was driven ashore at Scutari, Ottoman Empire. She was on a voyage from Malta to Constantinople, Ottoman Empire.
Star	United Kingdom	The schooner struck the pier at Hartlepool, County Durham and was wrecked with the loss of all but one of her crew.

== 22 December ==
List of shipwrecks: 22 December 1848
Ship	State	Description
Bittern	United Kingdom	The schooner was abandoned off Saint Thomas, Virgin Islands as her crew feared an attack by pirates. Believe subsequently captured and scuttled. Her crew were rescued by the schooner Osier (United Kingdom).
Doris	Wismar	The ship was driven ashore "at Syria". She was on a voyage from Newcastle upon Tyne, Northumberland, United Kingdom to Odesa, Russian Empire.
Eclipse	United Kingdom	The ship ran aground and was wrecked at Sandhamn, Sweden. She was on a voyage from Pillau, Prussia to Harwich, Essex.
Enterprise	United Kingdom	The ship foundered in the Irish Sea 14 nautical miles (26 km) south east of the Arklow Lightship ( Trinity House). Her crew were rescued.
Eliza Stone	United Kingdom	The schooner ran aground on the Gunfleet Sand, in the North Sea off the coast of Essex. She was on a voyage from Bremen to London. She was refloated and taken in to Wivenhoe, Essex in a leaky condition.
Fortschritt	Stettin	The brig was wrecked on the Goodwin Sands, Kent, United Kingdom. Her crew were rescued. She was on a voyage from Stettin to Dublin, United Kingdom.
Hector	United Kingdom	The ship was wrecked on the Holm Sand, in the North Sea off the coast of Suffolk. Her crew were rescued. She was on a voyage from Hamburg to London.
Lois	(United Kingdom of Great Britain and Ireland) British North America	The ship departed from Yarmouth, Nova Scotia for Liverpool, Nova Scotia. No further trace, presumed foundered with the loss of all hands.
Mary	(United Kingdom of Great Britain and Ireland) Barbados	The sloop was wrecked on Guadeloupe with the loss of one life. She was on a voyage from Barbados to Antigua.
Perseverance	Belgium	The ship was run aground and was damaged on the Maplin Sand, in the North Sea off the coast of Essex. She was on a voyage from "Nordenschluys" to Jersey, Channel Islands. She was refloated and taken in to Harwich, Essex.
Pursuit	United Kingdom	The ship sprang a leak and sank in the North Sea. Her crew were rescued. She was on a voyage from Newcastle upon Tyne, Northumberland to Great Yarmouth, Norfolk.
Sydney	United Kingdom	The ship was in collision with Gazelle (United Kingdom) and sank off St. Ann's Head, Pembrokeshire. Her crew were rescued by Gazelle. Sydney was on a voyage from Portmadoc, Caernarfonshire to Newcastle upon Tyne.
Victorieux	France	The ship was wrecked at the mouth of the Llobregat with the loss of all but one of her crew. She was on a voyage from Martinique to Marseille, Bouches-du-Rhône.

== 23 December ==
List of shipwrecks: 23 December 1848
Ship	State	Description
Clara Maria	Danzig	The ship was wrecked on the Corton Sand, in the North Sea off the coast of Suffolk, United Kingdom. Her crew were rescued. She was on a voyage from Danzig to London, United Kingdom. She was refloated on 11 January 1849 and taken in to Lowestoft, Suffolk.
Columbine	United Kingdom	The schooner was driven ashore at Point of Ayre, Isle of Man with the loss of a crew member. She was on a voyage from Glasgow, Renfrewshire to Liverpool, Lancashire.
Diana	United Kingdom	The ship ran aground in the Ley. She was on a voyage from Norden to Hull, Yorkshire. She was refloated.
Henry Duncan	United Kingdom	The ship ran aground on a reef off Prospect, Nova Scotia, British North America. She was on a voyage from Saint John, New Brunswick to Portsmouth, New Hampshire, United States. She had been refloated by 10 January 1849 and towed in to Halifax, Nova Scotia.
Glenbervie	United Kingdom	The ship ran aground leaving Bathurst Basin, Bristol, fell over, lost her masts, and had to be raised and later repaired.
Industry	United Kingdom	The ship was wrecked near Tralee, County Kerry. She was on a voyage from Limerick to Tralee.
Lady Hilda	(United Kingdom of Great Britain and Ireland) Jersey	The ship was driven ashore at the North Foreland Lighthouse, Kent. Her crew were rescued. She was on a voyage from London to Jersey.
Mars	(United Kingdom of Great Britain and Ireland) Jersey	The barque was driven ashore near Ramsey, Isle of Man. She was on a voyage from Liverpool to Buenos Aires, Argentina. She was refloated on 8 January 1849 and taken in to Ramsey.
Mercury	United Kingdom	The brig ran aground and was damaged on the Gunfleet Sand, in the North Sea off the coast of Essex. She was on a voyage from Sunderland, County Durham to London. She was refloated.
Peace	United Kingdom	The ship was wrecked on the Kish Rocks, in Hoy Sound. She was on a voyage from Rostock to Scarborough, Yorkshire.

== 24 December ==
List of shipwrecks: 24 December 1848
Ship	State	Description
Charles Edouard	France	The ship was abandoned off New Grimsby, Isles of Scilly, United Kingdom. She was subsequently taken in to port in a derelict condition.
Equator	United Kingdom	The ship ran aground on the Holm Sand, in the North Sea. She was on a voyage from Hamburg to London. She was refloated and taken in to Wivenhoe, Essex in a leaky condition.
Fanny	United Kingdom	The ship ran aground on the West Rocks, in the North Sea off the coast of Essex. She was on a voyage from London to Sunderland, County Durham. She was refloated and taken in to Harwich, Essex.
Favourite	United Kingdom	The ship was driven ashore at Dundalk, County Louth. She was on a voyage from London to Newry, County Antrim.
Ganges	United Kingdom	The schooner was in collision with Carlota (United States) and foundered off Lood Head, County Clare. A crew member of Carlota was killed in the collision.
Hebe	United Kingdom	The brig ran aground and was wrecked on the Maplin Sand, in the North Sea off the coast of Essex. She was refloated on 29 December and taken in to Southend, Essex.
Janet	United Kingdom	The ship foundered in the North Sea off Scarborough, Yorkshire. Her crew were rescued. She was on a voyage from Newcastle upon Tyne, Northumberland to London.
Mercury	United Kingdom	The brig ran aground on the Corton Sand, in the North Sea off the coast of Suffolk. She was refloated but was consequently beacned near Lowestoft, Suffolk. Her crew were rescued.
Perseverance	United Kingdom	The ship was driven ashore at St. Ives, Cornwall. She was on a voyage from Liverpool, Lancashire to Antwerp, Belgium. She was refloated on 26 December and taken in to St. Ives.
Pilot	(United Kingdom of Great Britain and Ireland) New South Wales	The schooner ran aground at Sydney. She was on a voyage from Sydney to Hobart, Van Diemen's Land.
Sarah Parker	United Kingdom	The ship was driven ashore and wrecked 4 nautical miles (7.4 km) south of Newcastle, County Down. Her crew were rescued. She was on a voyage from Liverpool to Savannah, Georgia, United States.
Skylark	United Kingdom	The schooner was wrecked on the Gunfleet Sand, in the North Sea off the coast of Essex. Her crew were rescued by the smack Violet (United Kingdom). Skylark was on a voyage from Hamburg to London.
Speculator	United Kingdom	The ship was wrecked near Youghal, County Cork. Her crew were rescued.
Susan	United Kingdom	The ship was wrecked on Hare Island, County Cork. Her crew were rescued.

== 25 December ==
List of shipwrecks: 25 December 1848
Ship	State	Description
Charlotte	Sweden	The ship was wrecked on Meledgan, in the Isles of Scilly, United Kingdom with the loss of five of the fifteen people on board. She was on a voyage from Gothenburg to Montevideo, Uruguay.
Emily	United Kingdom	The brig foundered in the Atlantic Ocean. Her ten crew took to the boat and were rescued the next day by the brig Jane and Margaret (United Kingdom). Emily was on a voyage from Newcastle upon Tyne, Northumberland to Messina, Sicily.
Esquimaux	United Kingdom	The ship was driven ashore at Rothesay, Isle of Bute, Inner Hebrides. Her crew were rescued. She was on a voyage from Greenock, Renfrewshire to Antigua.
Express	Hamburg	The schooner ran aground on the Maplin Sand, in the North Sea off the coast of Essex, United Kingdom. She was on a voyage from the Elbe to Bristol, Gloucestershire, United Kingdom. She was refloated.
George	United Kingdom	The barque was wrecked on the Black Middens, in the North Sea off the coast of County Durham. Her crew were rescued. She was on a voyage from South Shields, County Durham to London. George was refloated on 4 January 1849 and taken in to South Shields, County Durham.
Gipsy	United Kingdom	The smack was driven ashore at Cairnryan, Wigtownshire. She was on a voyage from Newry, County Antrim to Girvan, Ayrshire.
Hearts of Oak	United Kingdom	The brig was wrecked on the Newcombe Sand, in the North Sea off the coast of Suffolk. Her crew were rescued. She was on a voyage form Newcastle upon Tyne, Northumberland to Poole, Dorset.
Kitty	United Kingdom	The ship was driven ashore and wrecked at Penzance, Cornwall with the loss of a crew member. She was on a voyage from Newport, Monmouthshire to Penzance.
Mercury	United Kingdom	The ship ran aground on the Corton Sand, in the North Sea off the coast of Suffolk and was wrecked. Her crew were rescued.

== 26 December ==
List of shipwrecks: 26 December 1848
Ship	State	Description
Achilles	Greece	The brig was wrecked at Messina, Kingdom of the Two Sicilies with the loss of two of her crew. She was on a voyage from Castellamare di Stabia to Naples.
Alexander	United Kingdom	The ship was driven ashore at Messina.
Annsbro'	United Kingdom	The ship was driven ashore at Messina. She was refloated.
Argo	United Kingdom	The ship was driven ashore at Walmer, Kent. She was on a voyage from Cardiff, Glamorgan to Hartlepool, County Durham. She was refloated and put in to Ramsgate, Kent.
Columbine	United Kingdom	The ship was driven ashore at Point of Ayre, Isle of Man.
Collier	United Kingdom	The flat sprang a leak and sank at Maryport, Cumberland. Her crew survived. She was on a voyage from Dumfries to Maryport.
Colony	United Kingdom	The brig was driven ashore and damaged at Messina.
Concordia	Belgium	The ship was lost near Elsmhorn, Kingdom of Hanover. Her crew were rescued. She was on a voyage from Gijón, Spain to London, United Kingdom.
Coriolanus	United States	The ship was driven ashore and damaged at Messina.
Courier	United Kingdom	The ship was driven ashore at Crookhaven, County Cork. She was on a voyage from Saint Domingo to Hamburg. She was refloated with assistance from HMS Trident (Royal Navy).
Crescent	United Kingdom	The brig was driven ashore and damaged at Messina.
Eclipse	United Kingdom	The ship was driven ashore and wrecked at Lockeport, Nova Scotia, British North America.
Elisa	Denmark	The ship was driven ashore at Great Yarmouth, Norfolk, United Kingdom. She was on a voyage from Aarhus to London.
Evangelisha	Greece	The ship was driven ashore and wrecked at Messina. She was on a voyage from La Spezia to Livorno, Grand Duchy of Tuscany.
Farmer	United Kingdom	The brig was driven ashore and damaged at Messina.
Gesina	Kingdom of Hanover	The schooner was driven ashore and damaged at Messina.
Glynne	United Kingdom	The ship ran aground on the Doom Bar and was damaged. She was on a voyage from Chester, Cheshire to London.
Jeune Edward	France	The ship foundered in Freshwater East Bay. Her crew were rescued She was on a voyage from Nantes, Loire-Inférieure to Cardiff.
Lady Rotilliard	(United Kingdom of Great Britain and Ireland) Guernsey	The ship was driven ashore at North Foreland, Kent. She was on a voyage from London to Guernesy. She was refloated and taken in to Ramsgate, Kent.
Lisette	Kingdom of the Two Sicilies	The ship was driven ashore and damaged at Messina.
Newton	United Kingdom	The ship was driven ashore and sank at Waterloo, Lancashire. She was on a voyage from Kronstadt, Russia to Liverpool, Lancashire. She was refloated on 3 January 1849 and taken in to Liverpool.
Petit	France	The ship was wrecked on the Newgate Sands, in St. Brides Bay with the loss of all but four of her crew. She was on a voyage from Nantes, Loire-Inférieure to Swansea, Glamorgan.
Sto Stefano	Greece	The ship was wrecked at Messina. Her crew were rescued. She was on a voyage from La Spezia to Messina.
Thenea	France	The ship was wrecked in Clonea Bay with the loss of four of her crew. She was on a voyage from Nantes to Liverpool.
Thombasi	Kingdom of Greece	The ship was driven ashore and wrecked at Messina. Her crew were rescued. She was on a voyage from Trieste to Messina.
Tiber	United States	The ship was driven ashore and damaged at Messina.
Three Brothers	Denmark	The ship was wrecked on the Woolpack Sand, in the North Sea off the coast of Norfolk. Her crew were rescued. She was on a voyage from Rudkøbing to Hull, Yorkshire, United Kingdom.
Stephen Knight	United Kingdom	The ship was driven ashore and severely damaged at Penzance, Cornwall. Her crew were rescued. She was refloated on 9 January 1849.
William and Maria	United Kingdom	The brig was driven ashore and damaged at Messina.

== 27 December ==
List of shipwrecks: 27 December 1848
Ship	State	Description
Angler	United Kingdom	The ship ran aground on the Gunfleet Sand, in the North Sea off the coast of Essex.
Ann	(United Kingdom of Great Britain and Ireland) British North America	The brig was driven against the quayside at New York, United States and was severely damaged. She was on a voyage from New York to Portland, Maine, United States.
Catharina	Hamburg	The ship was wrecked near Wainfleet, Lincolnshire, United Kingdom.
Centurion	United Kingdom	The schooner was abandoned at Malta.
Creole	Malta	The brig sank at Malta. She was refloated in July 1848.
Harmonie	Netherlands	The galiot ran aground at Holyhead, Anglesey, United Kingdom.
Indus	United States	The ship was driven ashore and wrecked on Smith Island, Maryland. She was on a voyage from Rio de Janeiro, Brazil to Baltimore, Maryland.
Lady Newborough	United Kingdom	The ship was driven ashore at Malta. She was on a voyage from Liverpool, Lancashire to Malta. She was refloated with assistance from HMS Vengeance (Royal Navy).
Laura	United Kingdom	The ship was driven ashore and damaged on Malta. She was on a voyage from Smyrna, Ottoman Empire to Liverpool.
Letitia	United Kingdom	The ship ran aground on the Arklow Bank, in the Irish Sea off the coast of County Wicklow. She was on a voyage from Liverpool, Lancashire to New Orleans, Louisiana, United States. She was refloated and put in to Cobh, County Cork.
Main	United Kingdom	The schooner was driven ashore at the entrance to the Agger Canal, Denmark. She was on a voyage from Thisted, Denmark to London. She was refloated on 31 December and taken in to Thisted for repairs.
Maria	United Kingdom	The ship was driven ashore at the entrance to the Agger Canal. She was refloated on 6 January 1849 and taken in to Thisted, Denmark for repairs.
Newton	United Kingdom	The ship was driven ashore and sank at Waterloo, Lancashire. She was on a voyage from Kronstadt, Russia to Liverpool.
Nicola	Greece	The brig was abandoned at Malta. She was on a voyage from Syra to Livorno, Grand Duchy of Tuscany.
Palinurus	United Kingdom	The ship was wrecked on the Leon Rock, in the Isles of Scilly with the loss of all hands. She was on a voyage from Demerara, British Guiana to London.
Racehorse	United Kingdom	The ship was abandoned at Malta.
Rose Adelaide	France	The ship was driven ashore and wrecked at Liscannor, County Clare, United Kingdom. She was on a voyage from Marseille, Bouches-du-Rhône to Liverpool, Lancashire, United Kingdom.
St. Vincent	United Kingdom	The barque was driven ashore near Oban, Argyllshire.
Teesdale	United Kingdom	The brig foundered in the North Sea off Cromer, Norfolk. Her crew were rescued.

== 28 December ==
List of shipwrecks: 28 December 1848
Ship	State	Description
A.M.U.M.A.C.K.E	United States	The ship was driven ashore in Broad Cove, Nova Scotia, British North America. She was on a voyage from New York to Halifax, Nova Scotia.
Ancona	France	The ship was wrecked off Guernsey, Channel Islands. All on board were rescued. She was on a voyage from New Orleans, Louisiana, United States to Havre de Grâce, Seine-Inférieure.
Blunderbuss	United Kingdom	The brig foundered in the Mediterranean Sea 150 nautical miles (280 km) east of Malta. Her crew were rescued by the brig Sempre il Stesso ( Kingdom of Sardinia).
Cognac	United Kingdom	The ship ran aground at Littlehampton, Sussex.
Defiance	United Kingdom	The schooner was wrecked at Port Medway, Nova Scotia, British North America. Her crew were rescued.
Exile	United Kingdom	The ship was abandoned in the Atlantic Ocean 30 nautical miles (56 km) south south west of the Isles of Scilly. Her crew were rescued by Hymen (United Kingdom). Exile was on a voyage from Catania, Sicily to Newcastle upon Tyne, Northumberland.
Fairy Polka	United Kingdom	The schooner was presumed to have foundered in the Mediterranean Sea with the loss of all seven of her crew. She was on a voyage from Beyrout, Ottoman Lebanon to Malta.
Georgiana	Netherlands	The ship ran aground on the Shipwash Sand, in the North Sea off the coast of Essex, United Kingdom. She was on a voyage from Amsterdam, North Holland to Livorno, Grand Duchy of Tuscany.
Gleaner	United Kingdom	The ship was driven ashore and wrecked on the coast of Norway with the loss of all but two of her crew. She was on a voyage from Stralsund to Leith, Lothian.
Hunter	(United Kingdom of Great Britain and Ireland) British North America	The brigantine was driven ashore at Liverpool, Nova Scotia. She was refloated.
Reform	United Kingdom	The ship was driven ashore and wrecked at Christiansand, Norway with the loss of all but two of her crew. She was on a voyage from Stettin to Leith, Lothian.
Sollecito Bocchese	Austrian Empire	The brig was driven ashore at Żurrieq, Malta. She was refloated on 5 January 1849 and towed in to Malta by HMS Medusa (Royal Navy).
Staouell	France	The ship departed from Valparaíso, Chile for San Francisco, Alta California. She subsequently caught fire and foundered.
Stork	United Kingdom	The ship was abandoned at Malta. She subsequently sank.
Susan	United Kingdom	The schooner was wrecked at LaHave, Nova Scotia. Her crew were rescued. She was on a voyage from Boston, Massachusetts, United States to Halifax.
Sylph	(United Kingdom of Great Britain and Ireland) British North America	The ship was wrecked on the Blue Rocks, off Lunenburg, Nova Scotia. Her crew were rescued. She was on a voyage from Saint Thomas, Virgin Islands to Lunenburg.

== 29 December ==
List of shipwrecks: 29 December 1848
Ship	State	Description
Carl Peter	Norway	The brig was abandoned in the Mediterranean Sea off Malta. Her crew were rescued by the brig Carl Gustav (Prussia). Carl Peterwas towed in to Malta the next day by the steamship Osiris (France). She was on a voyage from Licata to Messina, Sicily.
Davies	United Kingdom	The schooner was driven ashore and wrecked at Portmadoc, Caernarfonshire.
Exchange	United Kingdom	The ship ran aground off Blyth, Northumberland.
John Alexander	United Kingdom	The schooner sprang a leak and foundered in the North Sea off Cromer, Norfolk. Her crew were rescued by Integrity (United Kingdom). John Alexander was on a voyage from Newcastle upon Tyne, Northumberland to Folkestone, Kent.
La Fayette	Sweden	The schooner was driven ashore and wrecked at Seaford, Sussex, United Kingdom with the loss of two of her seven crew.
Lesbo	Flag unknown	The ship was abandoned in the Mediterranean Sea. Her crew were rescued by Solido (Flag unknown).
Novo Vigilante	Portugal	The ship was in collision with the schooner Aquia (Portugal) off São Miguel Island, Azores. She drove ashore and was wrecked the next day.
Stag	United Kingdom	The ship ran aground and was damaged in the River Boyne. She was on a voyage from Liverpool, Lancashire to Drogheda, County Louth. She was refloated and taken in to Drogheda in a leaky condition.
Teasdale	United Kingdom	The ship was wrecked on the Haisborough Sands, in the North Sea off the coast of Norfolk.

== 30 December ==
List of shipwrecks: 30 December 1848
Ship	State	Description
Callao	Hamburg	The ship ran aground on Orange Key. She was on a voyage from Hamburg to New Orleans, Louisiana, United States. She was refloated on 2 January 1849 and resumed her voyage.
Carse, or Corso	United Kingdom	The ship was driven ashore and wrecked at "Klitmoller", Denmark. Her crew were rescued. She was on a voyage from Newcastle upon Tyne, Northumberland to Gothenburg, Sweden.
Herbert Huntingdon	(United Kingdom of Great Britain and Ireland) British North America	The ship was driven ashore at St. Margarets Bay, Nova Scotia. Her crew were rescued. She was on a voyage from Heneagua to Halifax, Nova Scotia.
Hindoo	United Kingdom	The ship was destroyed by fire en route from Australia to London a few hundred kilometres south south west of the Cape Verde Islands. Twenty passengers and crew were rescued on 3 January 1849 by William Fisher (United Kingdom). Hindoo was on a voyage from the Swan River Colony to London.
Minerva	United Kingdom	The brig was driven ashore near Sunderland, County Durham. She was on a voyage from Stettin to Sunderland.
Panaja Spiliotessa	Malta	The brig was driven ashore near Tunis, Beylik of Tunis.
Rambler	(United Kingdom of Great Britain and Ireland) British North America	The ship was driven ashore on Deer Island, New Brunswick. Her crew were rescued. She was on a voyage from Saint John, New Brunswick to Boston, Massachusetts, United States.
Regina	United Kingdom	The ship was driven ashore and wrecked at Hartlepool, County Durham. Her crew were rescued. She was on a voyage from London to Hartlepool.
Tyro	United Kingdom	The ship was damaged at Hartlepool, County Durham by an explosion of gas in her cargo of coal.

== 31 December ==
List of shipwrecks: 31 December 1848
Ship	State	Description
Boa	Portugal	The ship was driven ashore and wrecked on Madeira.
Delphine	Portugal	The ship was driven ashore and wrecked on Madeira.
Ferreira I	Portugal	The ship was driven ashore and wrecked on Madeira.
Levant	United States	The schooner was driven ashore and wrecked on Madeira with the loss of a crew member.
Prince of Wales	United Kingdom	The ship ran aground and was severely damaged at Bideford, Devon. She was on a voyage from Prince Edward Island, British North America to Bideford.
Shamrock	United Kingdom	The ship ran aground on the Scullmartin Rock, off the coast of County Down. She was on a voyage from Ayr to Wexford. She was refloated on 1 January 1849 and taken in to Carrickfergus, County Antrim.
Standard	United Kingdom	The ship was wrecked near Martinique with the loss of ten of her crew. She was on a voyage from Demerara, British Guiana to Liverpool, Lancashire.

== Unknown date ==
List of shipwrecks: Unknown date in December 1848
Ship	State	Description
Agnes	United Kingdom	The ship was driven ashore in the Bay of Brenda. She was on a voyage from "Brenda", Ottoman Empire to a British port. She had been refloated by 6 December.
Agnes Hay	(United Kingdom of Great Britain and Ireland) New Zealand	The ship was wrecked on the Ninety Mile Beach before 6 December. Her crew were rescued.
Alabama	United States	The ship was driven ashore near Gallipoli, Ottoman Empire before 24 December. She was refloated on 6 January 1849 and taken in to Gallipoli.
Annette Gilbert	United Kingdom	The ship was driven ashore south of "Amask" before 16 December. She was on a voyage from Stettin to London. She was refloated and put in to Copenhagen, Denmark for repairs.
B. C. Bayley	United States	The ship was driven ashore on "Limone Island". She was on a voyage from New York to the Clyde.
Bird	United Kingdom	The ship ran aground on the Boulmer Rocks, on the coast of Northumberland. She was refloated and taken in to South Shields, County Durham, where she was beached on 30 December.
Bornholm	Bremen	The ship was abandoned in the Atlantic Ocean before 3 December.
Compton	United Kingdom	The ship was abandoned in the Atlantic Ocean before 28 December.
Cygnet	(United Kingdom of Great Britain and Ireland) British North America	The ship was abandoned in the Atlantic Ocean. Her crew were rescued by Veunti Masyas (Spain).
Eden	Hamburg	The ship was driven ashore and wrecked near Buenos Aires, Argentina. Her crew were rescued.
Flora	United Kingdom	The ship was driven ashore at Gallipoli before 24 December.
Forest Monarch	United Kingdom	The ship was driven ashore and wrecked on "Inniskeagh", County Donegal.
Glenbervie	United Kingdom	The ship ran ashore, capsized and sank at Bristol, Gloucestershire. She was on a voyage from Bristol to Newport, Monmouthshire and Havana, Captaincy General of Cuba. Glenbervie was refloated on 27 December.
Harriet Leithard	(United Kingdom of Great Britain and Ireland) New Zealand	The ship was wrecked at the mouth of the Wanganui River before 6 December. Her crew were rescued.
James Wearne	United Kingdom	The ship foundered off the coast of Cornwall before 10 December. She was on a voyage from Falmouth, Cornwall to Limerick.
Jane Anderson	United Kingdom	The ship was driven ashore in the Dardanelles before 15 December.
Lucius Carey	United Kingdom	The ship was lost at Sulina, Ottoman Empire before 21 December.
Macintosh	United Kingdom	The schooner was driven ashore in the Teddetfjord. She was refloated on 4 December and taken in to Flekkefjord, Norway.
Martha	United Kingdom	The ship was driven ashore at Rostrevor, County Down. She was refloated on 21 December and taken in to Warrenpoint.
Meister Meyer	Lübeck	The brig was driven ashore near Vyborg, Grand Duchy of Finland before 6 December.
Merker	Denmark	The ship was wrecked on the Kentish Knock on or about 25 December with the loss of all hands. She was on a voyage from Sønderborg to Hong Kong and/or Canton, China.
Milton	United Kingdom	The ship was wrecked near Oysterhaven, County Cork before 18 December. She was on a voyage from Palermo, Sicily to London.
Ocean	United Kingdom	The ship was wrecked on the Kentish Knock. Her crew were rescued. She was on a voyage from Newcastle upon Tyne, Northumberland to Havre de Grâce, Seine-Inférieure, France.
Pitton	United Kingdom	The ship departed from the Mumbles for Africa in early December. Subsequently foundered with the loss of all hands. A nameboard from the ship was discovered off Milford Haven, Pembrokeshire in late December.
Premier	United Kingdom	The ship was driven ashore and severely damaged near Theddlethorpe, Lincolnshire before 16 December. She was on a voyage from Newcastle upon Tyne to Naples, Kingdom of the Two Sicilies. She was refloated on 28 December and towed in to Grimsby, Lincolnshire.
Princess of Wales	United Kingdom	The brig was wrecked on the Gunfleet Sand. She was on a voyage from Hamburg to London.
Royal Adelaide	United Kingdom	The ship was wrecked on the Colorados before 21 December. She was on a voyage from British Honduras to Cork.
San Nicolo	Moldavia	The ship departed from Constantinople, Ottoman Empire for a British port. No further trace, presumed foundered with the loss of all hands.
Sylph	United Kingdom	The ship was driven ashore in the Bay of Benin before 25 December. She was on a voyage from Africa to Liverpool. She was refloated with assistance from HMS Blazer (Royal Navy) and placed under repair.
Thespina	Greece	The ship foundered in the Mediterranean Sea 80 nautical miles (150 km) west of Malta. Her crew were rescued by Bordeaux Packet (France). Thespina was on a voyage from the Danube to Livorno, Grand Duchy of Tuscany.
Venus	Lübeck	The ship foundered in the Baltic Sea before 5 December with the loss of all hands. She was on a voyage from Lübeck to Helsinki, Grand Duchy of Finland.
Victoire	France	The ship was wrecked at Kerlouan, Finistère. She was on a voyage from Honfleur, Calvados to La Rochelle, Charente-Maritime and New Orleans, Louisiana, United States.
William Sprague	United Kingdom	The ship was wrecked on Inch Island, County Donegal. Her crew were rescued. She was on a voyage from Nova Scotia, British North America to Liverpool.
