= Rice House =

Rice House may refer to:

in Australia

- Rice House (Melbourne), Australia

in the United States

- Green Pryor Rice House, Somerville, Alabama, listed on the National Register of Historic Places (NRHP) in Morgan County
- Rice House (Bentonville, Arkansas), NRHP-listed in Benton County
- James A. Rice House, Bentonville, Arkansas, NRHP-listed in Benton County
- Rice-Upshaw House, Dalton, Arkansas, NRHP-listed in Randolph County
- Lilian Jenette Rice House, Rancho Santa Fe, California, NRHP-listed in San Diego County
- Ida M. Rice House, Colorado Springs, El Paso County, Colorado, NRHP-listed
- Ward Rice House, Pueblo, Colorado, listed on the NRHP in Pueblo County
- House at 7217 Ventura Avenue, Jacksonville, Florida, also known as the Rice House, NRHP-listed in Duval County
- Clifton Rice House, West Palm Beach, Florida, NRHP-listed in Palm Beach County
- Strong-Davis-Rice-George House, Eatonton, Georgia, NRHP-listed in Putnam County
- John W. Rice Summer Cottage, Smyrna, Georgia, listed on the NRHP in Cobb County
- John C. Rice House, Caldwell, Idaho, listed on the NRHP in Canyon County
- Rice-Packard House, Pocatello, Idaho, listed on the NRHP in Bannock County
- J.R. Rice Farmstead, Cullison, Kansas, listed on the NRHP in Pratt County
- Wiley Rice House, Asa, Kentucky, listed on the NRHP in Johnson County
- Rice House (Clay Village, Kentucky), listed on the NRHP in Shelby County
- Rice-Worthington House, Danville, Kentucky, listed on the NRHP in Boyle County
- Rice House (New Orleans, Louisiana), listed on the NRHP in Orleans Parish
- Capt. Peter Rice House, Marlborough, Massachusetts, listed on the NRHP in Middlesex County
- Ezra Rice House, Worcester, Massachusetts, listed on the NRHP in Worcester County
- Rice-Tremonti House, Raytown, Missouri, listed on the NRHP in Jackson County
- Hart-Rice House, Portsmouth, New Hampshire, listed on the NRHP in Rockingham County
- Larkin-Rice House, Portsmouth, New Hampshire, listed on the NRHP in Rockingham County
- MacLeod–Rice House, Middletown Towhsnip, New Jesery, listed on the NRHP in Monmouth County
- Rice Hall (Ithaca, New York), listed on the NRHP in Tompkins County
- Oliver Rice House, Mayfield, New York, listed on the NRHP in Fulton County
- Isaac L. Rice Mansion, New York, New York, listed on the NRHP in Manhattan County
- Clough H. Rice House, Hendersonville, North Carolina, listed on the NRHP in Henderson County
- Paisley-Rice Log House, Mebane, North Carolina, listed on the NRHP in Orange County
- Silas A. Rice Log House, Condon, Oregon, listed on the NRHP in Gilliam County
- Richard and Helen Rice House, Hillsboro, Oregon, listed on the NRHP in Washington County
- Rice–Gates House, Hillsboro, Oregon, listed on the NRHP in Washington County
- Napoleon Rice House, Roseburg, Oregon, listed on the NRHP in Douglas County
- Rice-Pennebecker Farm, Chester Springs, Pennsylvania, listed on the NRHP in Chester County
- Rice-Marler House, Decatur, Tennessee, listed on the NRHP in Meigs County
- Rice House (Richmond, Virginia), listed on the NRHP in Virginia
- L. N. Rice House, Yelm, Washington, listed on the NRHP in Thurston County

== See also ==
- Rice Building, Troy, New York
- Rice Lofts, Houston, Texas
