= Ezra Rice House =

Historic house in Massachusetts, United States

- U.S. National Register of Historic Places
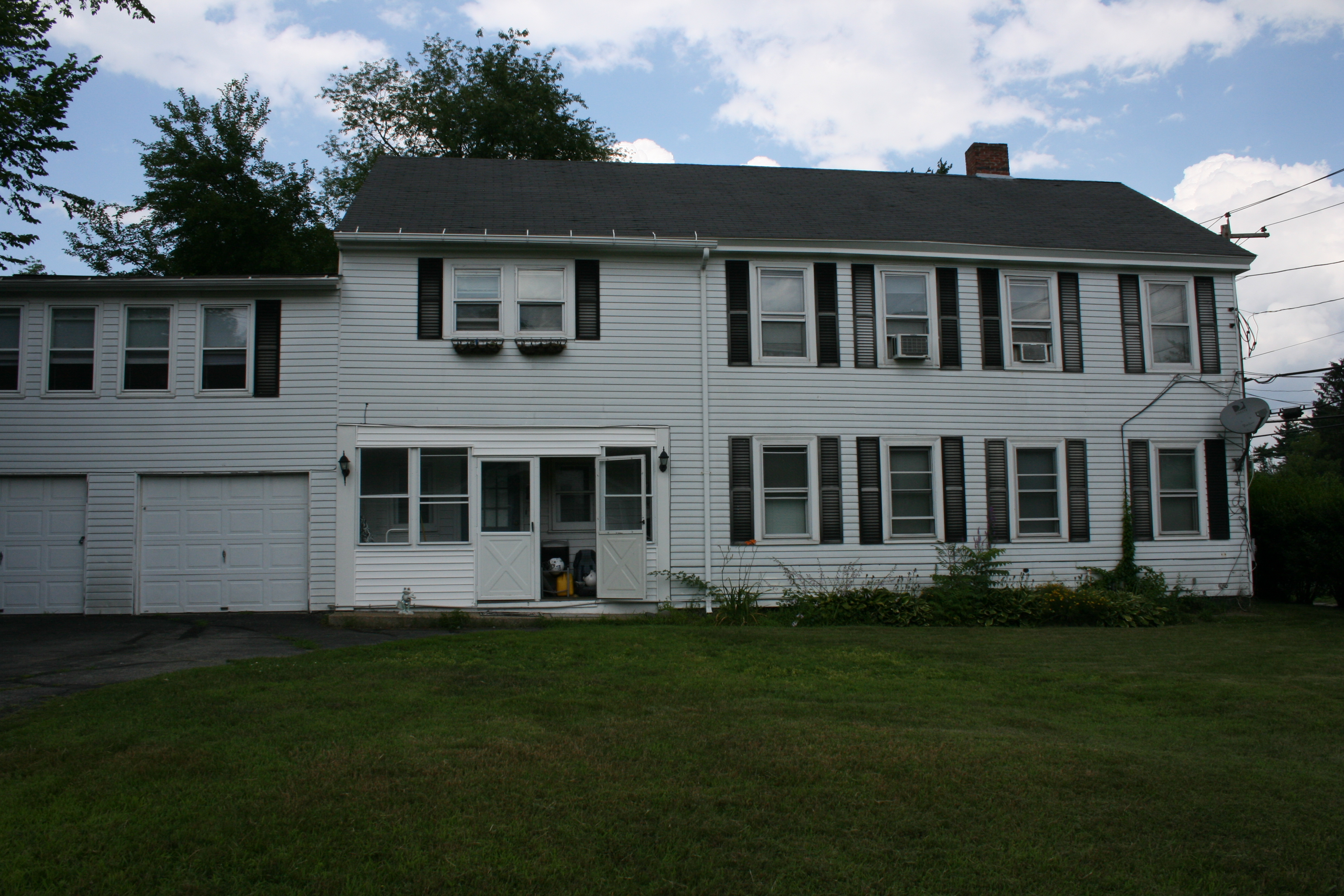

- Location within Massachusetts Location within the United States
- Location: 1133 W. Boylston St., Worcester, Massachusetts
- Coordinates: 42°20′4″N 71°47′24″W
- Area: less than one acre
- Built: c. 1833
- Architectural style: Greek Revival
- MPS: Worcester MRA
- NRHP reference No.: 80000507
- Added to NRHP: March 05, 1980

The Ezra Rice House is a historic house at 1133 West Boylston Street in Worcester, Massachusetts. It was built sometime between 1833 and 1845, and was a rare local example of transitional Federal and Greek Revival styling. Most of significant exterior details have been obscured or lost due to the application of modern siding. It was listed on the National Register of Historic Places in 1980.

== Description and history ==
The Ezra Rice House stands in a residential area in far northern Worcester, at the northwest corner of West Boylston Street and Wilbur Road. It is a 2 1/2-story wood-frame structure, with a gabled roof and exterior finished in modern siding. A full-height 2 1/2-story ell extends to the rear, joining the main block to a modern garage. The main facade, facing West Boylston Street, is three bays wide, with the main entrance in the rightmost bay, and windows placed irregularly in the two left bays. The entrance is the only portion of the exterior retaining significant Greek Revival features: it has flanking half-height sidelight windows, and is set in a slight recess flanked by pilasters and topped by a corniced entablature. The entry was virtually identical to that of the Charles Newton House (another period house in the city), and is derived from examples published by Asher Benjamin in 1830.

Due to the house's location remote from the city center, little is known of the property prior to 1851, when Ezra Beamon Rice is recorded as living here. Rice is likely a member of the Beamon family that was historically prominent in the affairs of West Boylston, and is poorly documented in Worcester records.

== See also ==
- National Register of Historic Places listings in eastern Worcester, Massachusetts
