= Harry V. Gates =

American engineer and politician

Member of the Oregon House of Representatives
- In office 1895–1897
- Constituency: Washington County

Personal details
- Born: July 30, 1847 Lowell, Massachusetts
- Died: October 13, 1935 (aged 88) Portland, Oregon
- Resting place: Hillsboro Pioneer Cemetery; 45.52062°N 123.00463°W
- Party: Republican
- Spouse: Helen Melvina Batcheller

Harry Verner Gates (July 30, 1847 – October 13, 1935) was an American engineer and politician in the state of Oregon. A native of Massachusetts, he later lived in Iowa worked on the railroads before settling in Hillsboro, Oregon, where he shifted to water projects. A member of the Republican Party, he served a single term in the Oregon House of Representatives. His former home in Hillsboro is the historic Rice–Gates House, and his former ranch in Central Oregon is now the Crooked River Ranch.

== Early life ==
Harry Gates was born on July 30, 1847, in Lowell, Massachusetts, to John M. and Lydia S. (née Bowker) Gates. He grew up in Iowa where he attended the local public schools in DeWitt. In 1862, he enlisted with the 6th Regiment Iowa Volunteer Cavalry during the time of the American Civil War. Gates was a private, later serving as bugler, and spent three years in the military, leaving in 1865. His unit fought against Native Americans on the Great Plains.

Following his time in the army, he worked for the Davenport and St. Paul Railroad as a leveler in 1869 and then in 1870 was placed in charge of building track and bridges on the Callao, Lima & Oroya Railway in Peru. Gates married in 1871 to Helen Melvina Batcheller, and they had three children, Oliver, Helen, and Samuel. In 1880, he worked for the Northern Pacific Railway where he was responsible for the locating party through the Cascade Range. The next year Gates started working for the Oregon & Pacific Railroad in Corvallis, first as their locater then as superintendent of construction, and in 1886 he was the railroad's superintendent. Gates continued to work for the railroads, and was responsible for the construction of over 2,000 miles of track from 1891 until 1922. He worked for the Union Pacific Railroad as superintendent of construction from 1887 until 1891 when he moved to Hillsboro, Oregon. Gates was also the chief engineer for the Oregon Railroad and Navigation Company for a time.

== Political career ==
Gates voted for Abraham Lincoln in the 1860 presidential election, and remained a Republican the rest of his life. In 1894, he was elected to the Oregon House of Representatives from Washington County. Gates represented District 56 and served only in the 1895 legislative session.

== Later years ==
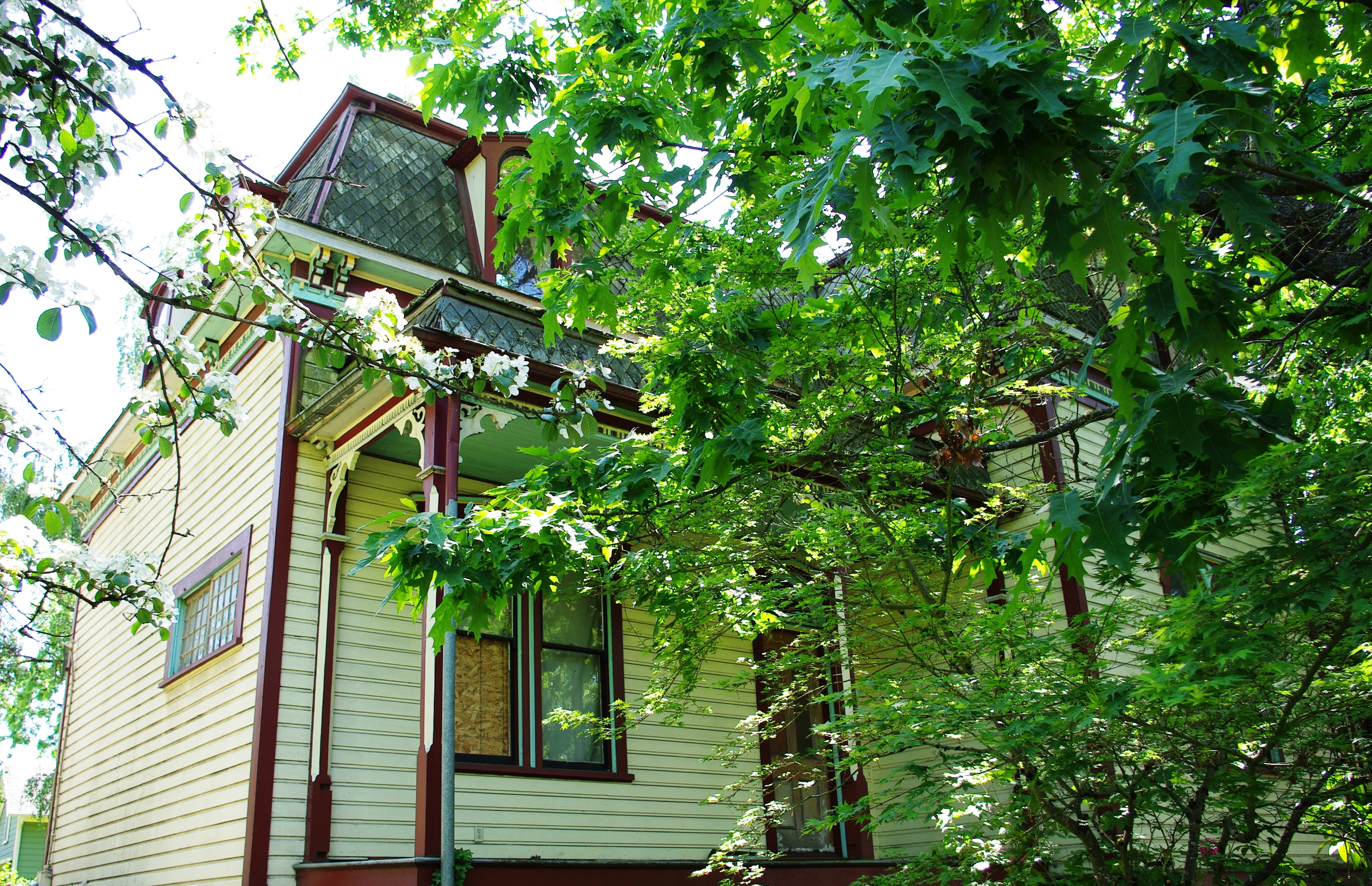
His former home in 2008

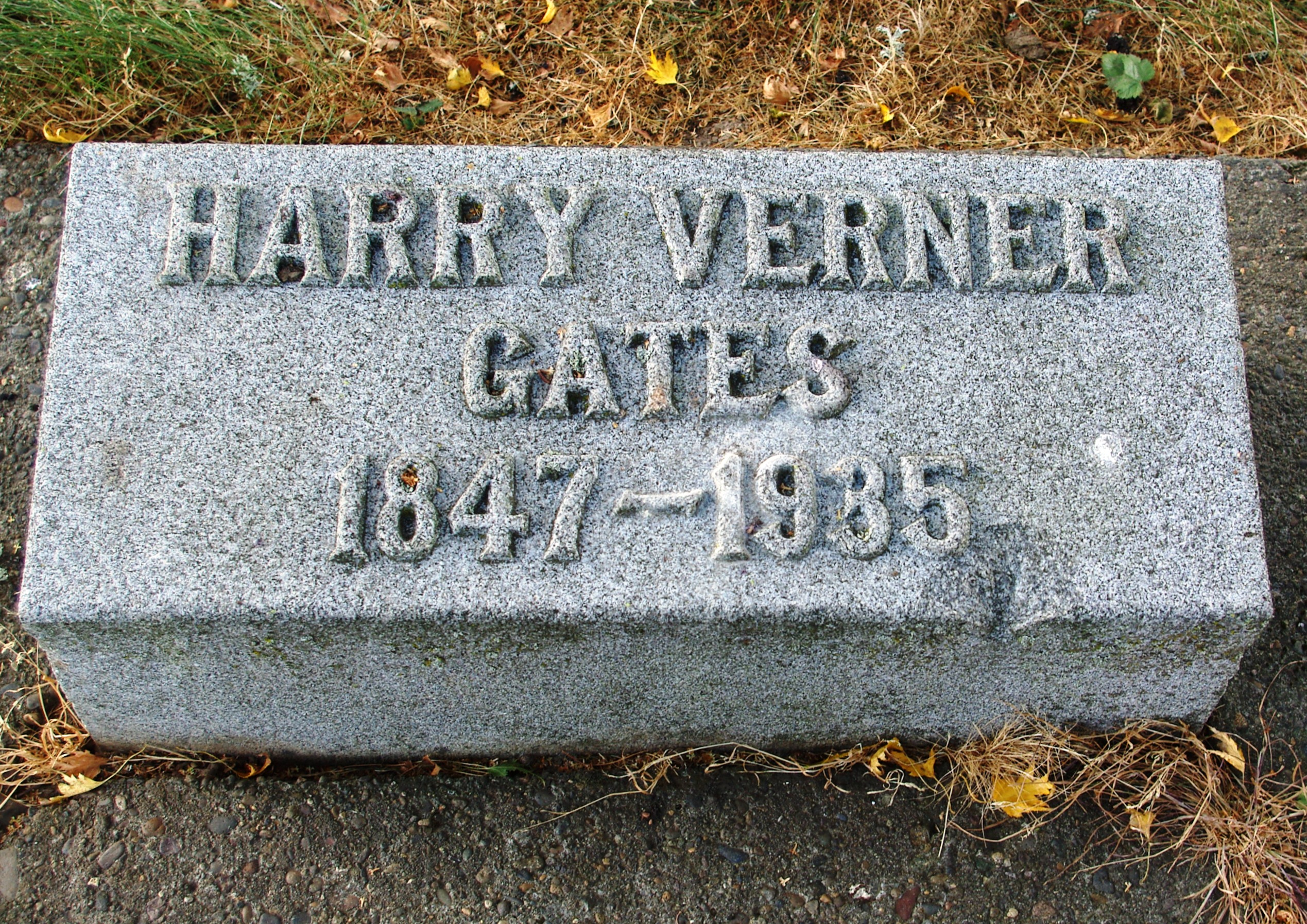
Gates gravestone

Following his main career with the railroads, Gates began a second career as an engineer for water projects. In 1896, he and George T. Baldwin built the Linkville Light & Water Plant on the Link River near Klamath Falls, Oregon. Gates also served as the engineer for the Heppner Light & Water Company in Eastern Oregon in addition to his duties as engineer, superintendent, and president of the Hillsboro Electric Light & Water Company at the turn of the century.

Gates was selected as the Commander of the Oregon Department of the Grand Army of the Republic in 1899. He served three more terms as Commander of the Oregon chapter in the 1930s. In 1903, he purchased a new residence south of the downtown area on Walnut Street. The Second Empire style home had been built in 1890, and Gates lived there until 1927. In 1903, the Governor of Oregon appointed Gates to a committee to devise new laws governing water rights in the state. He was a member of the Thirteenth National Irrigation Congress held in 1905 in Portland.

As early as 1909 and through at least 1920 he served as a director for the Shute Savings Bank in Hillsboro. He continued as president of what was later the Hillsboro Power and Investment Company. He was granted a license by the state to install an irrigation system and power generating facility on the Crooked River in Jefferson County in 1925 that provided electricity and water for his adjoining ranch.

Along with his son Oliver, he owned a pipe making factory in Hillsboro and over 500 miles of telephone lines in Southern Oregon. Gates was a member of the Congregational Church, the American Association of Engineers, the American Water Works Association, and a member of the Masons, among other groups. Harry V. Gates died on October 13, 1935, in Portland at the age of 88 and was buried at the Hillsboro Pioneer Cemetery. His former home was added to the National Register of Historic Places in 1980 as the Rice–Gates House. His ranch in Central Oregon became the Crooked River Ranch.
