= Musholm =

Island in the Great Belt, Denmark

- Location within Denmark

Geography
- Location: Great Belt
- Coordinates: 55°28′35″N 11°04′38″E
- Area: 0.25 km^{2} (0.097 sq mi)
- Highest elevation: 9 m (30 ft)

Administration
- Denmark

Demographics
- Population: 0

Musholm is a small island in Denmark. The highest point is 9 meters above sea level.

There is only one house on the island. It is being used by the company Musholm Lax.
It is a popular place for sailors. There is no real harbor, but it's possible to anchor.
