= Rice Lake (Mille Lacs County, Minnesota) =

Lake in the state of Minnesota, United States

- Location within Minnesota
- Location: Mille Lacs County, Minnesota
- Coordinates: 45°34′20″N 93°39′10″W
- Type: lake

Rice Lake is a lake in Mille Lacs County, in the U.S. state of Minnesota.

Rice Lake was named for its wild rice which was a staple food of the Ojibwe Indians.

== See also ==
- List of lakes in Minnesota
