= Rices Spring =

Spring in Floyd County, Georgia, U.S.

Coordinates: 34°16′4.34″N 85°15′16.83″W

Rices Spring is a spring in Floyd County, in the U.S. state of Georgia.

Rices Spring was named for the Rice family, the original landowners.

== See also ==
- List of rivers of Georgia (U.S. state)
