= Rice High School =

Rice High School may refer to:

- Rice High School (Manhattan, New York), New York City
- Rice High School (Altair, Texas), Altair, Texas
- Rice High School (Rice, Texas), Rice, Texas
- Rice Memorial High School, South Burlington, Vermont
- Brother Rice High School (Chicago, Illinois), Chicago, Illinois
- Brother Rice High School (Michigan), Bloomfield Hills, Michigan
- Sauk Rapids-Rice High School, Sauk Rapids, Minnesota
