= Rice (given name) =

Rice is a masculine given name and may refer to:

- Rice Garland (1799–1863), U.S. Representative from Louisiana
- Rice Alexander Pierce (1848–1936), American politician and member of the U.S. House of Representatives from Tennessee
- Rice Powell, an officer in the First and Second English Civil Wars
- Rice Rees (1804–1839), Welsh cleric and historian
- Rice Sheppard (1861–1947), Canadian politician and farmers' activist
