= Rice–Gates House =

Historic house in Oregon, United States

- U.S. National Register of Historic Places
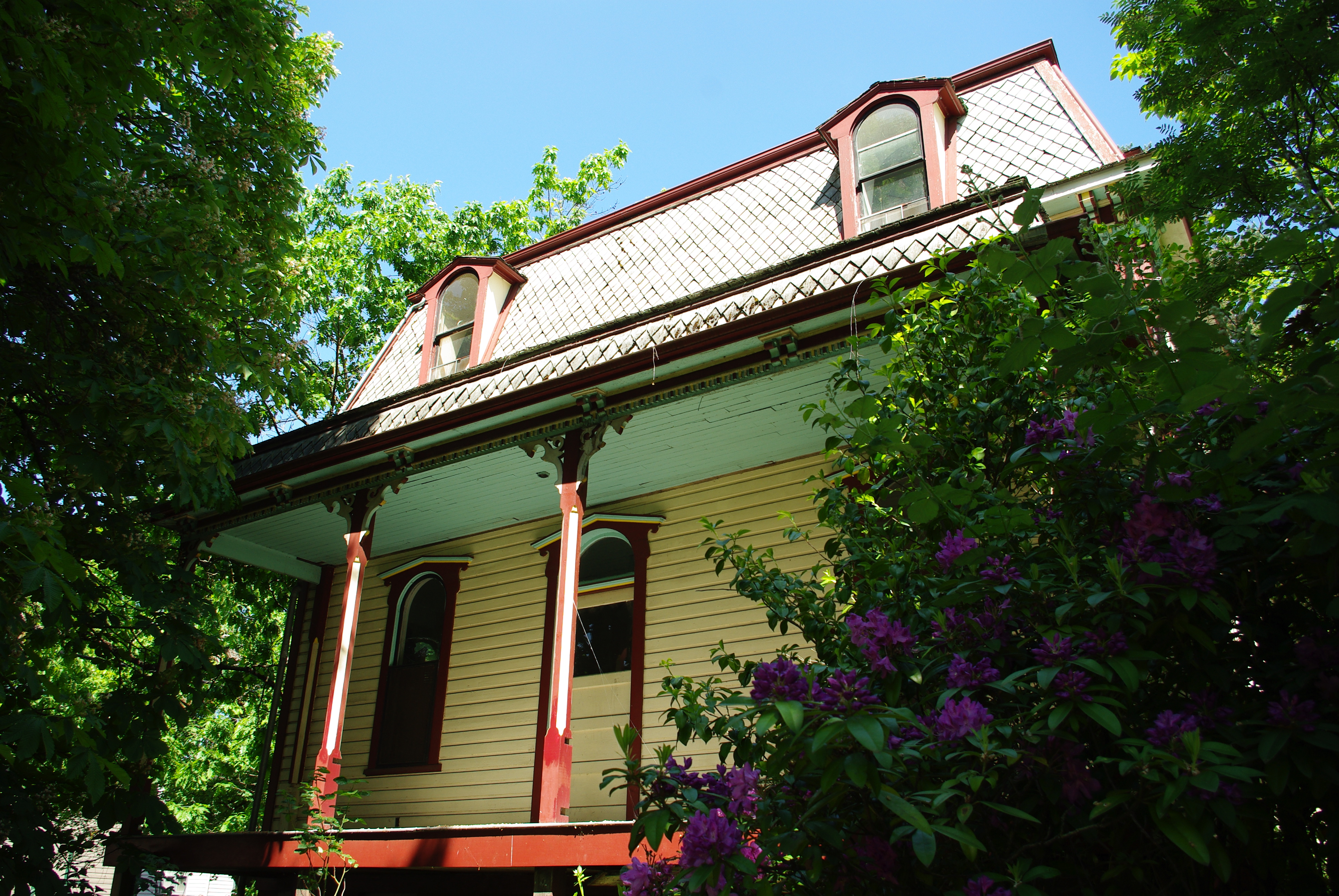
- Front of building in 2008

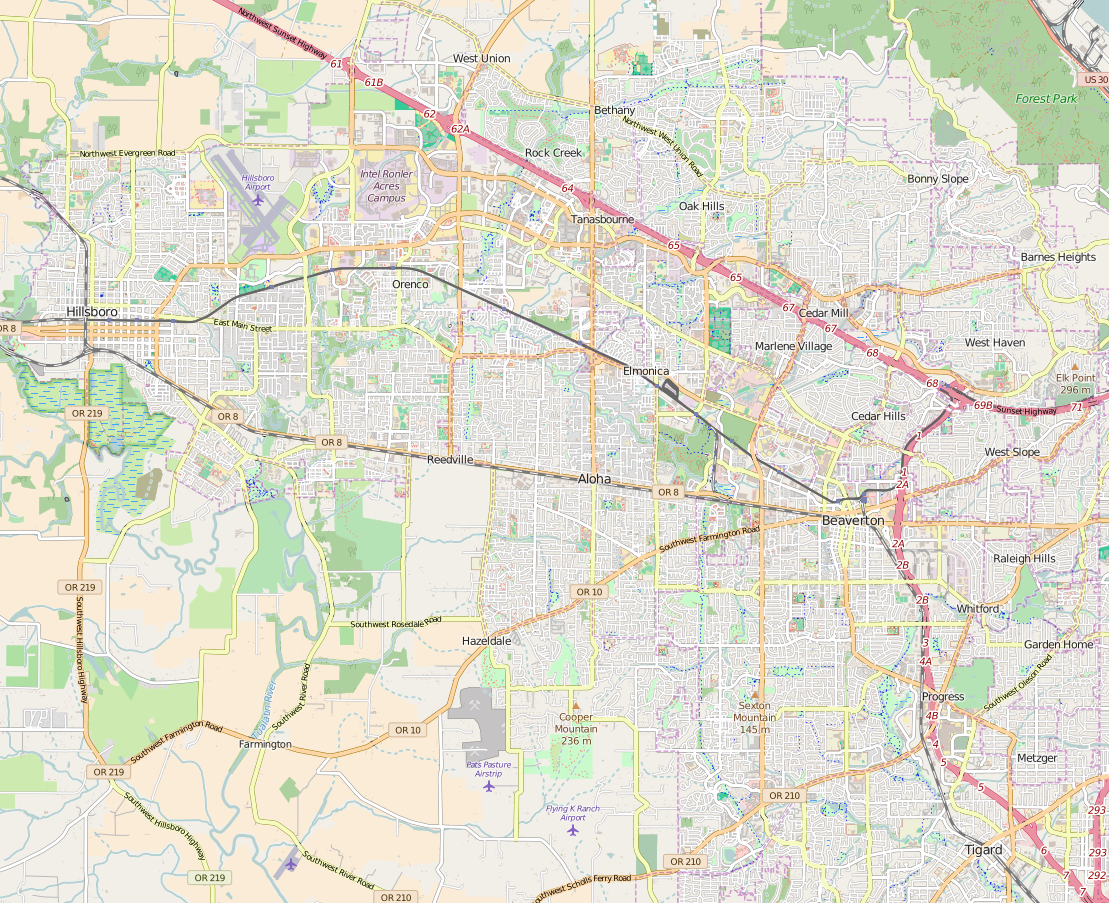
- Location within Hillsboro Beaverton OR
- Location: Hillsboro, Oregon, USA
- Coordinates: 45°31′2″N 122°59′9″W
- Built: 1890
- NRHP reference No.: 80003391
- Added to NRHP: September 8, 1980

The Rice–Gates House is a historic private residence on Southeast Walnut Street in downtown Hillsboro, Oregon, United States. Completed in 1890, the Second Empire architectural style structure stands two stories tall with a mansard roof. The wood building was added to the National Register of Historic Places in 1980 and is named after several former owners, William Rice, Harry V. Gates, and his son Oliver.

== History ==
In 1890, attorney William J. Rice had a new two-story home built for him in an area that was then south of downtown Hillsboro. He sold the home to Harry V. Gates in 1903, a former state legislator. Gates sold the home in 1911 to his son Oliver B. Gates, though Harry continued to live in the house. Both lived in the residence until 1927, and a garage that was once part of the property was added to the adjacent property. The structure was added to the National Register of Historic Places on September 8, 1980. As of 2008, parts of the home are in disrepair, including the main steps leading to the home.

== Details ==
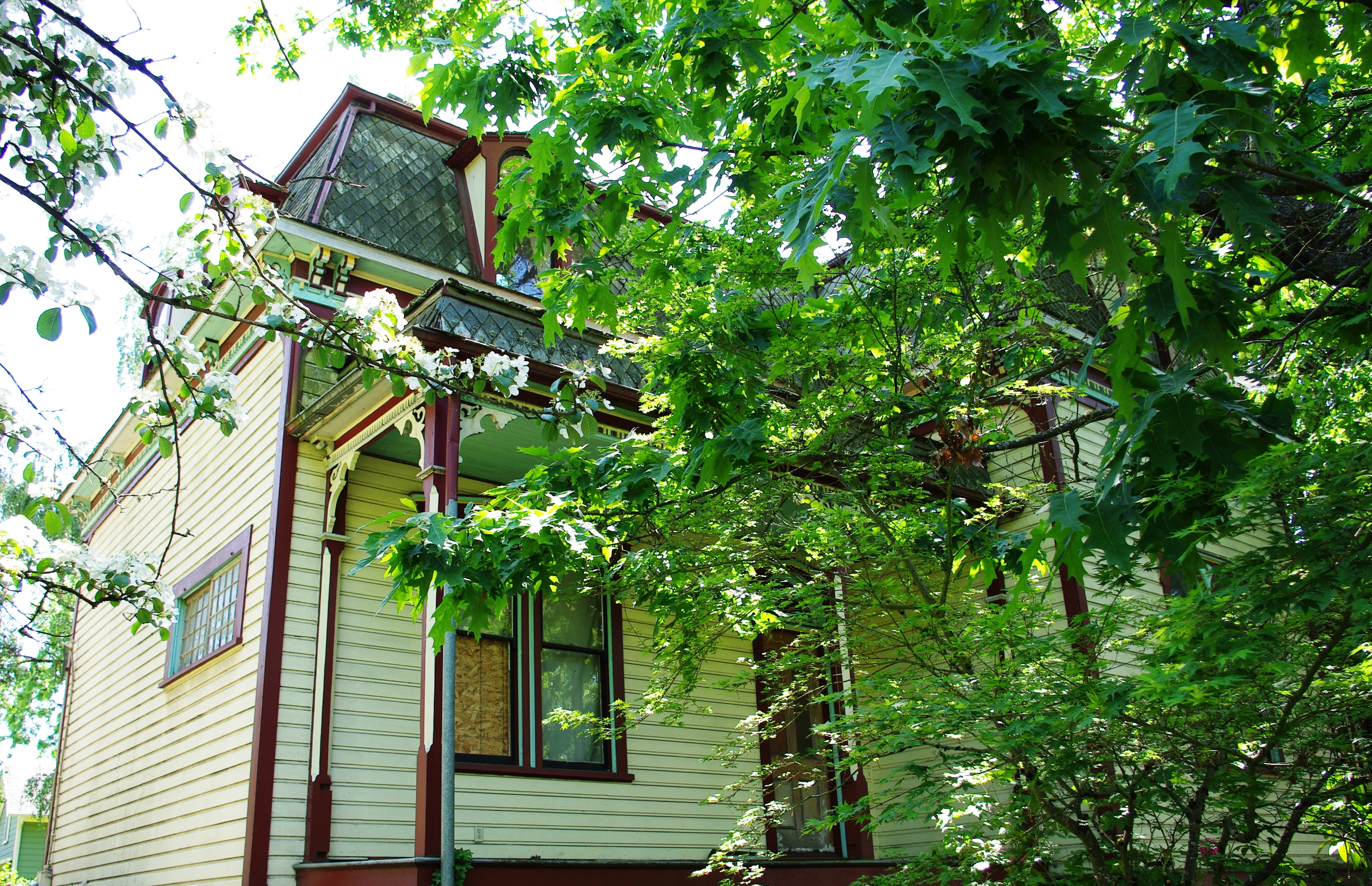
North and east sides of the home in 2008

The home is of the Second Empire style and has a mansard roof with diamond shaped shingles. The roof features include a boxed cornice, Gable fronted dormers, and eaves with paired brackets. Windows at the house are topped with an arch and contain a pediment above each window. Builders of the L-shaped home used balloon framing on the two-story wood building, which consists of using lumber tall enough to stretch from the basement to the top of the building instead of the bottom of the next floor.

Siding on the structure is made of horizontal wood boards and is painted yellow with burgundy and Aquamarine accents. Other exterior accents include bracketed posts and wood dentils. There are three porches on the outside as well, each topped with a matching mansard roof on a smaller scale than the main roof. One of these porches is a sun porch enclosed with glass, while the other two have arcaded bases supporting the roof. The posts are decorated with detailed scroll work at the top. Parts of the home have sets of paired windows, and the main entrance has an arched transom light to go with the pediment above the window.

The basement is composed of brick arranged in a stretcher bond pattern and is a look-out style with the majority of it above ground. The horizontal siding extends into the second floor with the steep-sloped mansard roof covering the remainder. The structure has two brick chimneys, both on the inside and topped with corbelled caps. Windows on the house are single hung sash windows opening from the bottom. Doors and the windows also have the decorative scroll work similar to that on the porch posts. The Rice–Gates House is on Southeast Walnut Street in the central part of Hillsboro.
