= Mallard Island =

Island in California

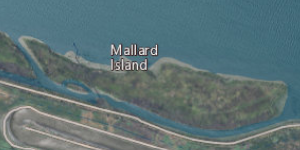
- USGS aerial imagery of Mallard Island; Suisun Bay is to the north, and West Pittsburg is to the south across Mallard Slough.

- Location within Sacramento-San Joaquin River Delta Location within California Location within the United States

Geography
- Location: Northern California
- Coordinates: 38°02′31″N 121°55′07″W
- Adjacent to: Suisun Bay
- Highest elevation: 3 ft (0.9 m)

Administration
- United States
- State: California
- County: Contra Costa

Mallard Island is a small island in Suisun Bay, at the confluence of the Sacramento and San Joaquin rivers. It is part of Contra Costa County, California. Its coordinates are 38°02′31″N 121°55′07″W, and the United States Geological Survey measured its elevation as 3 ft (0.91 m) in 1981. It appears in a 1953 USGS map of the area.
