= Rice Lake (Washington County, Minnesota) =

Lake in the state of Minnesota, United States

- Location within Minnesota
- Location: Washington County, Minnesota
- Coordinates: 45°9′40″N 92°57′52″W
- Type: lake

Rice Lake is a lake in Washington County, in the U.S. state of Minnesota.

Rice Lake was named for its abundant wild rice.

== See also ==
- List of lakes in Minnesota
