= Rice Lake (Rice County, Minnesota) =

Lake in the state of Minnesota, United States

- Location within Minnesota
- Location: Rice County, Minnesota
- Coordinates: 44°19′47″N 93°28′55″W
- Type: lake

Rice Lake is a lake in Rice County in the U.S. state of Minnesota. It was named for the abundant wild rice growing on the lake.

== See also ==
- List of lakes in Minnesota
