= Rice Lake (Pope County, Minnesota) =

Lake in the state of Minnesota, United States

- Location within Minnesota
- Location: Pope County, Minnesota
- Coordinates: 45°43′2″N 95°18′36″W
- Type: lake

Rice Lake is a lake in Pope County, in the U.S. state of Minnesota.

Rice Lake was named for the wild rice harvested there.

== See also ==
- List of lakes in Minnesota
