= Rice Lake (Wadena County, Minnesota) =

Lake in the state of Minnesota, United States

- Location within Minnesota
- Location: Wadena County, Minnesota
- Coordinates: 46°41′15″N 94°58′58″W
- Type: lake

Rice Lake is a lake in Wadena County, in the U.S. state of Minnesota.

Rice Lake was so named on account of the wild rice which grows naturally within this lake.

== See also ==
- List of lakes in Minnesota
