= Rice Stadium =

Rice Stadium may refer to:

- First Community Stadium, football stadium on the Rice University campus in Houston, Texas formerly called Rice Stadium
- Robert Rice Stadium, football stadium on the University of Utah campus in Salt Lake City, now called Rice-Eccles stadium
- Wendel D. Ley Track and Holloway Field, formerly known as Rice Track/Soccer Stadium
