= Rice Township =

Rice Township may refer to:

- Rice Township, Jo Daviess County, Illinois
- Rice Township, Ringgold County, Iowa
- Rice Township, Clearwater County, Minnesota
- Rice Township, Sandusky County, Ohio
- Rice Township, Luzerne County, Pennsylvania
