= Rice Lake (Hubbard County, Minnesota) =

Lake in the state of Minnesota, United States

- Location within Minnesota
- Location: Hubbard County, Minnesota
- Coordinates: 47°2′2″N 95°1′54″W
- Type: lake

Rice Lake is a lake in Hubbard County, in the U.S. state of Minnesota.

Rice Lake was named for the wild rice around the lake.

== See also ==
- List of lakes in Minnesota
