= Charles Newton House =

Historic house in Massachusetts, United States

- U.S. National Register of Historic Places
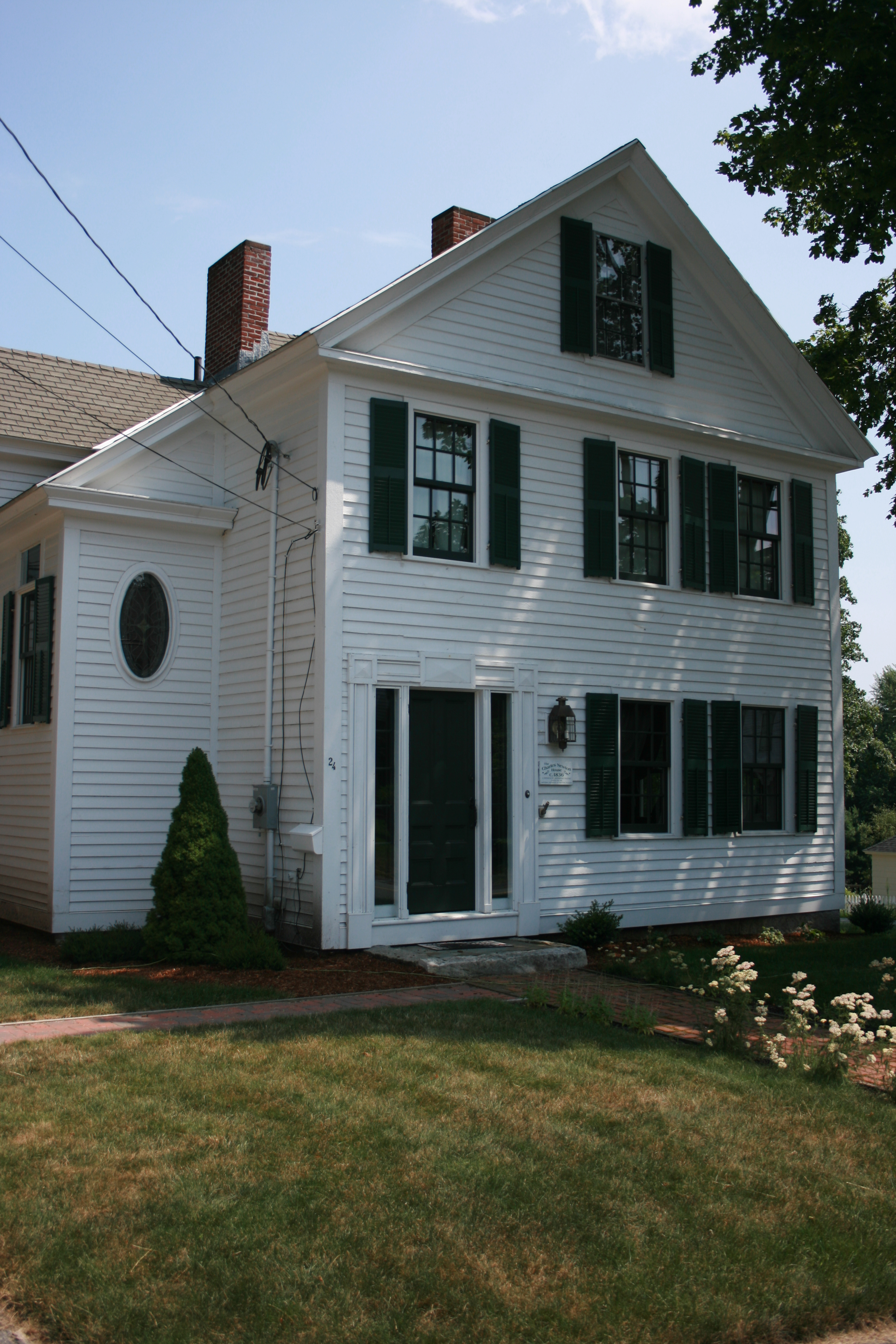

- Location within Massachusetts Location within the United States
- Location: 24 Brattle St, Worcester, Massachusetts
- Coordinates: 42°18′53″N 71°49′6″W
- Built: c.1846
- Architectural style: Greek Revival
- MPS: Worcester MRA
- NRHP reference No.: 80000508
- Added to NRHP: March 05, 1980

The Charles Newton House is a historic house at 24 Brattle Street in Worcester, Massachusetts.

== Description and history ==
The original owner of the house was Charles Newton, a farmer. The exact date of construction is not known, but it was most likely between 1846, when Newton acquired the land, and the early 1850s, when the house was first noted in the city directories. (Note: Although a date of circa 1839 has been assigned to the house, Caleb A. Wall in his history of the area notes that Charles Newton built the house and that prior to 1846 had lived in his family's former house, further up Brattle Street. That house, later numbered 52 Brattle Street, had been built by Joseph Temple in the eighteenth century, and was remodeled by Albert S. Lowell circa 1889 and demolished in 2005.) About 1861 Newton sold the property to Calvin Foster, railroad financier and founder and president of the City National Bank of Worcester. In 1890 Foster sold the house to architect James E. Fuller of the well-known firm of Fuller & Delano, who lived there until his death in 1901. Fuller's sons, also architects, built their own houses on the property. J. Edward Fuller, the elder, built his house at what is now numbered 40 Brattle Street about 1896, while Robert L. Fuller, the younger, had built his at 14 Brattle Street by 1911.

Likely built in 1840s, the 2 1/2-story wood-frame house is a rare local example of a house transitional between Federal and Greek Revival styling. The side hall, front gable plan is typically Greek Revival, but some details are Federal, such as the narrow corner boards. The doorway, flanked by sidelight windows and surrounded by an architrave with corner and center blocks, was derived from designs published by Asher Benjamin. The house's northern wing and main stair, featuring Colonial Revival details, was likely an addition added by Fuller.

The house was listed on the National Register of Historic Places in 1980.

== See also ==
- National Register of Historic Places listings in northwestern Worcester, Massachusetts
- National Register of Historic Places listings in Worcester County, Massachusetts
