= Oysterhaven =

Inlet in County Cork, Ireland

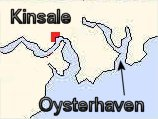
Local location map of Oysterhaven

Oysterhaven (Irish: Cuan Oisre) is a sea inlet on the coast of County Cork, Ireland, immediately to the east of Kinsale harbour. The townlands bordering the northern and eastern sides of the inlet are also known as Oysterhaven.

During the Siege of Kinsale, the English forces besieging the town brought supplies to their camp (which was located to the north of the town) by ship into Oysterhaven and thence by boat up the creek to Brown's Mills.

Oysterhaven is associated with the Gaelic Long family. Mount Long castle, now partly in ruin, was built by John Long in 1631. Located in a rural setting on the bank of Oysterhaven Bay, this is a very striking feature in the landscape. The castle is a good example of a seventeenth-century fortified house, built at a time when more domestic houses were coming to replace the defensive tower house. It is thought to have been burnt by its owners only twelve years after its construction, in 1643.

Oysterhaven is now home to a watersports and "outdoor education" centre.

== See also ==
- List of towns and villages in the Republic of Ireland
