= Mason Island =

Island in County Galway, Ireland

Native name: Oileán Máisean
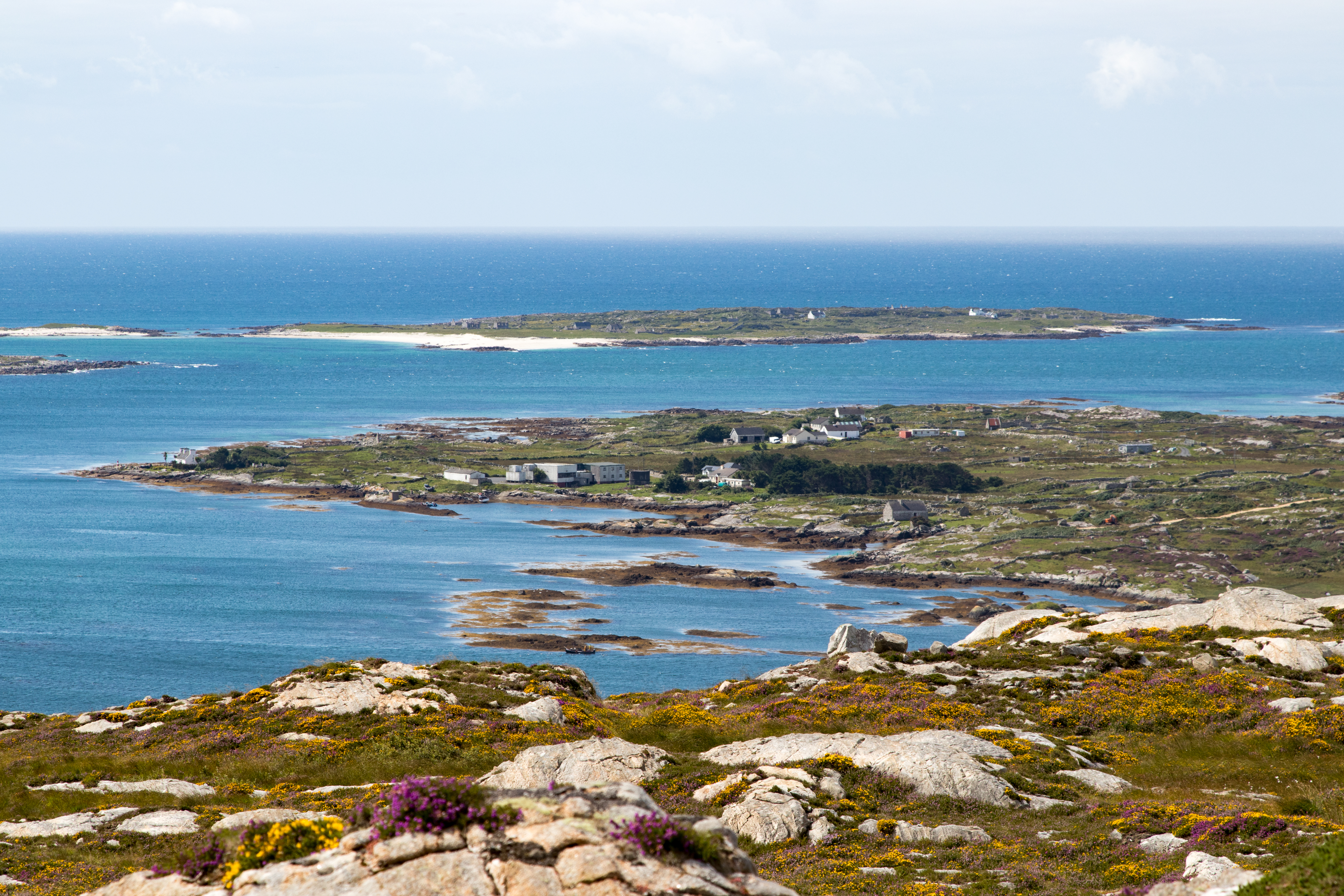
- Mason Island in the background

- Location within island of Ireland

Geography
- Location: Atlantic Ocean
- Coordinates: 53.298°N 9.865°W

Administration
- Ireland
- Province: Connacht
- County: Galway

Demographics
- Population: 0

Mason Island (Gaeilge: Oileán Máisean) is an uninhabited island located off the Galway coast near the village of Carna.

== History ==
The island has been uninhabited since 1957, but used to be home to 114 people. There are some abandoned properties on the island and some refurbished holiday homes which are available for rental. The island is not serviced by any ferries. Some early Christian relics have also been found on the island.

Historical population

Year	Pop.	±%
1841	98	—
1851	74	−24.5%
1861	84	+13.5%
1871	110	+31.0%
1881	127	+15.5%
1891	118	−7.1%
1901	76	−35.6%
1911	68	−10.5%

Year	Pop.	±%
1926	54	−20.6%
1936	37	−31.5%
1946	20	−45.9%
1951	10	−50.0%
1956	0	−100.0%
1961	0	0.00%
1966	0	0.00%
1971	0	0.00%

Year	Pop.	±%
1979	0	0.00%
1981	0	0.00%
1986	0	0.00%
1991	0	0.00%
1996	0	0.00%
2002	0	0.00%
2006	0	0.00%

Source: Central Statistics Office. "CNA17: Population by Off Shore Island, Sex and Year". CSO.ie.
