= List of islands by name (W) =

This article features a list of islands sorted by their name beginning with the letter W.

== W ==
Island's Name	Island group(s)	Country/Countries
Wabash	Ohio River, Kentucky	United States
Waderick Wells Cay	Bahamas	Bahamas
Wades	Potomac River, Maryland	United States
Wadmalaw	South Carolina	United States
Waglan	Po Toi Islands, Hong Kong	China
Waigeo	Raja Ampat Islands	Indonesia
Waiheke	Hauraki Gulf	New Zealand
Wakde	Papua	Indonesia
Wake	Wake Island, Pacific Ocean	United States
Wakenaam	Essequibo River	Guyana
Walcheren	Zeeland	Netherlands
Waldron	San Juan Islands, Washington	United States
Wales	Nunavut	Canada
Walfisch	Bay of Wismar Mecklenburg-Vorpommern	Germany
Walker Cay	Bahamas	Bahamas
Walkers	Horseshoe Lake, Illinois	United States
Wall	Georgian Bay, Ontario	Canada
Wall	Western Australia	Australia
Wallis	Wallis and Futuna	France
Walpole	Ontario	Canada
Walrus	Pribilof Islands, Alaska	United States
Water Cay	Bahamas, Turks and Caicos Islands	United Kingdom
Water Cay	Bahamas	Bahamas
Water Cay	Lesser Antilles, U.S. Virgin Islands	United States
Watermelon Cay	Lesser Antilles, U.S. Virgin Islands	United States
Wangerooge	East Frisian Islands, Lower Saxony	Germany
Warbah	Persian Gulf	Kuwait
Ward	Rhode Island	United States
Ward's	Boston Harbor, Massachusetts	United States
Wards	East River, New York	United States
Warnie Kępy	Oder Lagoon islands	Poland
Washington	Lake Michigan, Wisconsin	United States
Washington	New York	United States
Washington	Minnesota	United States
Washington	Michigan	United States
Washington's Landing	Allegheny River, Pennsylvania	United States
Watford	Bermuda	United Kingdom
Watkins	Potomac River, Maryland	United States
Watling	Bermuda	United Kingdom
Watlings	Bahamas	Bahamas
Watson	Biscayne Bay, Florida	United States
Wax Cay	Bahamas	Bahamas
Wayland	Thimble Islands, Connecticut	United States
Weatherford Cay	Bahamas	Bahamas
Weddell	Falkland Islands	United Kingdom
Weepecket	Elizabeth Islands, Massachusetts	United States
Welk Rocks	Lesser Antilles, U.S. Virgin Islands	United States
Well Cay	Bahamas	Bahamas
Wellesley	Lake Rosseau Ontario	Canada
Wellesley	Thousand Islands, St. Lawrence River, New York	United States
Wellington Island	Antártica Chilena Province	Chile
Wells	Ohio River, West Virginia	United States
West Brother	The Brothers, Hong Kong	China
West Brother	Islands of San Francisco Bay, California	United States
West Caicos	Bahamas, Turks and Caicos Islands	United Kingdom
West Cay	Bahamas	Bahamas
West Cay	Leeward Islands of the Lesser Antilles, Anguilla	United Kingdom
West Cay	Lesser Antilles, U.S. Virgin Islands	United States
West Crib	Thimble Islands, Connecticut	United States
West	Rhode Island	United States
West Dog	British Virgin Islands	United Kingdom
West Falkland	Falkland Islands	United Kingdom
West Linga	Shetland Islands	United Kingdom
West Point	Falkland Islands	United Kingdom
West Reef East Island (Da Tay A Island)	Part of the West London Reef, Spratly Islands	Disputed between: China, Republic of China, Vietnam, Brunei, Philippines, and Malaysia
West Sand Spit	Bahamas, Turks and Caicos Islands	United Kingdom
West Ship	Mississippi	United States
West Shroud Cay	Bahamas	Bahamas
West Sister	Lake Erie, Ohio	United States
West Summerland Key	Florida Keys, Florida	United States
West York	Spratly Islands	Disputed between: China, Republic of China, Vietnam, Brunei, Philippines, and Malaysia
Westcott	Bermuda	United Kingdom
Western	Georgian Bay, Ontario	Canada
Western Duck	Lake Huron, Ontario	Canada
Westham	British Columbia	Canada
Weston	James Bay, Nunavut	Canada
Westport	Mississippi River, Missouri	United States
Westray	The North Isles, Orkney Islands	United Kingdom
Wet Cay	Bahamas	Bahamas
Wetar	Maluku Islands	Indonesia
Whakaari	Bay of Plenty	New Zealand
Whale Cay	Bahamas	Bahamas
Whale	Bermuda	United Kingdom
Whale	Bay of Plenty	New Zealand
Whaelback	New Hampshire	United States
Whalers	Bermuda	United Kingdom
Whalsay	Shetland Islands	United Kingdom
Whanganui	Hauraki Gulf	New Zealand
Wheatland Bar	Willamette River, Oregon	United States
Wheeler	Kanawha River, West Virginia	United States
Wheeling	Ohio River, West Virginia	United States
Whidbey	Puget Sound, Washington	United States
Whistling Cay	Lesser Antilles, U.S. Virgin Islands	United States
White Cay	Bahamas	Bahamas
White Cay	Bahamas, Turks and Caicos Islands	United Kingdom
White	Otago	New Zealand
White	Bay of Plenty	New Zealand
Whitsunday	Whitsunday Islands	Australia
White	Lower Lough Erne, Northern Ireland	United Kingdom
White	Nunavut	Canada
White	Windward Islands of the Lesser Antilles	Grenada
White		Antarctica
White	Ross Archipelago	Antarctica
White	Isles of Shoals, New Hampshire	United States
White	Bermuda	United Kingdom
White	Bermuda	United Kingdom
White Bay Cay	Bahamas	Bahamas
White Cloud	Georgian Bay, Ontario	Canada
Whitefish	Lake Huron Ontario	Canada
White Head	New Brunswick	Canada
Wicked Will	Leeward Islands of the Lesser Antilles	Antigua and Barbuda
Wiegand	Belcher Islands, Nunavut	Canada
Wild Horse	Flathead Lake, Montana	United States
Wielki Krzek	Oder Lagoon islands	Poland
Wight	British Isles	United Kingdom
Wilhelm Island	Svalbard	Norway
Wilkes	Wake Island, Pacific Ocean	United States
Willemberg	Lesser Antilles, Netherlands Antilles	Kingdom of the Netherlands
Williams	Tennessee River, Tennessee	United States
Williamson	Ohio River, West Virginia	United States
Willingdon	Kochi, Kerala	India
Willow	Willamette River, Oregon	United States
Wilmington	Kankakee River, Illinois	United States
Wilson Cay	Bahamas	Bahamas
Wilson	Bermuda	United Kingdom
Wilson	Kanawha River, West Virginia	United States
Wiltshires Cay	Bahamas	Bahamas
Windermere	Bahamas	Bahamas
Windley	Florida Keys, Florida	United States
Windsor	Willamette River, Oregon	United States
Wiroa		New Zealand
Wislow	Fox Islands group of the Aleutian Islands, Alaska	United States
Wiszowa Kępa	Oder Lagoon islands	Poland
Witten Towhead	Ohio River, West Virginia	United States
Wizard	Crater Lake, Oregon	United States
Wolfe	Lake Ontario, Ontario	Canada
Wolin	Baltic Sea	Poland
Wong Wan Chau	Hong Kong	China
Wood Cay	Bahamas	Bahamas
Woods	Lake Champlain, Vermont	United States
Woolen Dean Cay	Bahamas	Bahamas
Wotho Atoll	Ralik Chain	Marshall Islands
Wotje Atoll		Marshall Islands
Wrangel	Chukotka Autonomous Okrug	Russia
Wrangell	Alexander Archipelago, Alaska	United States
Wreck	Georgian Bay, Ontario	Canada
Wuliaru	Maluku Islands	Indonesia
Wuvulu	Bismarck Archipelago	Papua New Guinea
Wydrza Kępa	Oder Lagoon islands	Poland
Wyre	The North Isles, Orkney Islands	United Kingdom

== See also ==
- List of islands (by country)
- List of islands by area
- List of islands by population
- List of islands by highest point
- Islands of the Great Lakes
