= List of islands by name (P) =

This article features a list of islands sorted by their name beginning with the letter P.

== P ==
Island's Name	Island group(s)	Country/Countries
Paama	Pacific Ocean	Vanuatu
Paden	Ohio River, West Virginia	United States
Paallavvik	Nunavut	Canada
Padre| Khh hvdie
Pag	Adriatic Sea	Croatia
Pak	Admiralty Islands	Papua New Guinea
Pakatoa	Hauraki Gulf	New Zealand
Palagruža	Adriatic Sea	Croatia
Palánki-sziget	Danube River	Hungary
Palau	Palau	Palau
Palawan	Visayas	Philippines
La Palma	Canary Islands	Spain
Palmeira	Alentejo Islands	Portugal
Palmeira Pequena	Alentejo Islands	Portugal
Palmerston	Cook Islands	Cook Islands
Palm Island	Aruba	Kingdom of the Netherlands
Palmižana	Adriatic Sea	Croatia
Palu'e	Lesser Sunda Islands	Indonesia
Panarea	Aeolian Islands	Italy
Panay	Visayas	Philippines
Pancake	Rhode Island	United States
Pandora	Nunavut	Canada
Pangkor	Perak	Malaysia
Panmure	Prince Edward Island	Canada
Pantar	Alor Archipelago	Indonesia
Pantelleria	Strait of Sicily	Italy
Pap-sziget	Danube River	Hungary
Papa	Shetland Islands	Scotland
Papa Little	Shetland Islands	Scotland
Papa Stour	Shetland Islands	Scotland
Papa Stronsay	The North Isles, Orkney Islands	Scotland
Papa Westray	The North Isles, Orkney Islands	Scotland
Paquetá	Guanabara Bay	Brazil
Parker	Alabama	United States
Parris	South Carolina	United States
Paros	Cyclades	Greece
Parrachill	Beira Litoral Islands	Portugal
Parry	Georgian Bay Ontario	Canada
Pasalimani	Marmara Islands	Turkey
Pasaran		Indonesia
Pašman		Croatia
Pasque	Elizabeth Islands, Massachusetts	United States
Pasumpahan		Indonesia
Pate	Lamu Islands	Kenya
Patience	Rhode Island	United States
Pátmos	Dodecanese	Greece
Patos	San Juan Islands, Washington	United States
Patroklou	Saronic Islands	Greece
Patton	Tennessee River, Alabama	United States
Paul	Newfoundland and Labrador	Canada
Pavell	Sabine River, Texas	United States
Paw Paw	Mississippi	United States
Pawleys	South Carolina	United States
Paxi	Ionian Islands	Greece
Pea Patch	Delaware	United States
Peach	Alabama	United States
Peach Blossom		China
Peaks	Casco Bay, Maine	United States
Peale	Wyoming	United States
Pearl	San Juan Islands, Washington	United States
Pearl River	Louisiana	United States
Pearse	British Columbia	Canada
Pebble	Falkland Islands	United Kingdom
Peberholm	artificial island at Øresund	Denmark
Peche	Detroit River, Ontario	Canada
Peddocks	Boston Harbor, Massachusetts	United States
Pedra Branca		Claimed by Singapore and Malaysia
Bedra	Beira Litoral Islands	Portugal
Pelee	Lake Erie, Ontario	Canada
Peleng	Kepulauan Banggai group	Indonesia
Pelican	Lake Shala	Ethiopia
Pelican	Alabama	United States
Pelican	Louisiana	United States
Pelican	Missouri	United States
Pelican	Nevada	United States
Pelican	Texas	United States
Pelican Point	Louisiana	United States
Pelican Roost	Wyoming	United States
Pellinge	Porvoo	Finland
Pellworm	North Frisian Islands	Germany
Pemba	Spice Islands	Tanzania
Penang	Straits of Malacca, Penang	Malaysia
Pender	Gulf Islands, British Columbia	Canada
Peng Chau	Islands District, Hong Kong	China
Penguin	Lüderitz Bay	Namibia
Penguin	South Shetland Islands	Claimed by Argentine Antarctica, Argentina, Antártica Chilena Province, Chile, and British Antarctic Territory, United Kingdom
Penikese	Elizabeth Islands, Massachusetts	United States
Penrhyn	Cook Islands	Cook Islands
Pentecost	Pacific Ocean	Vanuatu
Perceveira	Alentejo islands	Portugal
Perdido Key	Florida	United States
Isla Perejil Parsley Island	Plazas de Soberanía, Strait of Gibraltar	Spain
Perhentian Besar	Perhentian Islands	Malaysia
Perhentian Kecil	Perhentian Islands	Malaysia
Île Perrot	Quebec	Canada
Perry	Mississippi River, Missouri	United States
Perseverance	Lake Huron, Ontario	Canada
Peristera	Northern Sporades	Greece
Peruque	Mississippi River, Missouri	United States
Pessegueiro	Alentejo islands	Portugal
Pest	New Hampshire	United States
Petalas	Ionian Islands	Greece
Peter I	Bellingshausen Sea	Norway
Peters	Alabama	United States
Peters	Arkansas	United States
Petersfield	Delaware	United States
Petit Bois	Mississippi	United States
Petit de Grat	Nova Scotia	Canada
Petőfi-sziget		Hungary
Petrie Island	Ottawa River, Ottawa, Ontario	Canada
Pettys	New Jersey	United States
Pfaueninsel	Havel River	Germany
Pharaoh's	Gulf of Aqaba	Egypt
Pharaoh's	River Thames, England	United Kingdom
Pharra	Mississippi River, Missouri	United States
Pheasant	Bidasoa River, shared between Gipuzkoa and Pyrénées-Atlantiques	Shared by Spain and France
Philae	Nile River	Egypt
Phillips	Rhode Island	United States
Phillis	Barnstable Harbor, Massachusetts	United States
Phillis	Ohio River, Pennsylvania	United States
Pholegandros	Cyclades	Greece
Philo Brice	Timbalier Bay, Louisiana	United States
Phuket	Andaman Sea	Thailand
Phú Quốc	Gulf of Thailand	Vietnam
Pianosa	Tuscan Archipelago	Italy
Piasa	Mississippi River, Illinois	United States
Pickel	French Broad River, Tennessee	United States
Picket	Vermont	United States
Pico	Azores	Portugal
Picton	Antártica Chilena Province	Chile
Pictou	Nova Scotia	Canada
Pierce	Spofford Lake, New Hampshire	United States
Pig	Arkansas	United States
Pihlajasaari	Helsinki	Finland
Piirissaar	Lake Peipus	Estonia
Pike	Minnesota	United States
Pileni	Solomon Islands	Solomon Islands
Pine	Arkansas	United States
Pine	Arkansas	United States
Pine	Arkansas	United States
Pine	Georgian Bay Ontario	Canada
Pine	Windy Lake Ontario	Canada
Pine	Lake Huron, Ontario	Canada
Pine	Rhode Island	United States
Pine	Vermont	United States
Pine	Vermont	United States
Ping Chau	Hong Kong	China
Pinto	Alabama	United States
Piperi	Northern Sporades	Greece
Pippin Towhead	Alabama	United States
Pirallahı	Baku, Caspian Sea	Azerbaijan
Pirumeri	Shortland Islands	Solomon Islands
Piss Pot	South Branch Potomac River, West Virginia	United States
Pitcairn	Pitcairn Islands	(United Kingdom) British overseas territories
Isle au Pitre	Louisiana	United States
Pitt	British Columbia	Canada
Plane Crash	Arizona	United States
Plato	Rhode Island	United States
Pleasant	Arkansas	United States
Pleasant	Georgian Bay Ontario	Canada
Pleasure	Sabine Lake, Texas	United States
Plum	Massachusetts	United States
Plum	New York	United States
Plum	Lake Michigan, Wisconsin	United States
Plumpudding		Namibia
Plateia Aiginis	Saronic Islands	Greece
Poi Toi	Po Toi Islands, Hong Kong	China
Poço	Beira Litoral islands	Portugal
Poel	Baltic Sea	Germany
Pohnpei	Senyavin Islands, Micronesia	Federated States of Micronesia
Point au Fer	Louisiana	United States
Point of Cedars	Delaware	United States
Pollopel	Hudson River, New York	United States
Poker Hill	Arkansas	United States
Polyaigos	Cyclades	Greece
Pomham	Rhode Island	United States
Pomona		Namibia
Ponui	Hauraki Gulf	New Zealand
Ponza	Pontine Islands	Italy
Pooley	British Columbia	Canada
Popasquash	Vermont	United States
Popes	New Bedford Harbor, Massachusetts	United States
Poplar	Tygart Valley River, West Virginia	United States
Porcher	British Columbia	Canada
Poros	Saronic Islands	Greece
Port Hamilton		South Korea
Port	Islands of Gdańsk	Poland
Portage	Mississippi River, Missouri	United States
Portage	Georgian Bay Ontario	Canada
Portage	Washington	United States
Portland	British Isles	United Kingdom
Porto Santo	Madeira Islands	Portugal
Possession		Namibia
Potato	Severn Sound Ontario	Canada
Potato	Rhode Island	United States
Potvin	French River Ontario	Canada
Pourewa	Tolaga Bay	New Zealand
Poveglia	Venice	Italy
Powell	South Orkney Islands	Claimed by: United Kingdom as part of the Falkland Islands and by Argentina
Prairie Point Towhead	Mississippi River, Arkansas	United States
Prall's	Arthur Kill, New York	United States
Prangli	Gulf of Finland	Estonia
Premuda	Adriatic Sea	Croatia
Prescott	Nunavut	Canada
Prevlaka	Bay of Kotor Islands	Montenegro
Price	British Columbia	Canada
Price	Alabama	United States
Prickley Pear	Delaware	United States
Príncipe	Gulf of Guinea	São Tomé and Príncipe
Prince	Alabama	United States
Prince Charles	Queen Elizabeth Islands, Nunavut	Canada
Prince Edward	Prince Edward Island	Canada
Prince Patrick	Northwest Territories	Canada
Prince of Wales	British Columbia	Canada
Prince of Wales	Alaska	United States
Princess Royal	British Columbia	Canada
Prins Karls Forland	Svalbard	Norway
Procida	Flegree Islands	Italy
Profit	Mississippi River, Louisiana	United States
Protection	Washington	United States
Providencia	San Andrés y Providencia	Colombia
Providence	Vermont	United States
Province	Vermont	United States
Prudence	Narragansett Bay, Rhode Island	United States
Pruetts	Alabama	United States
Pruitt	Arkansas	United States
Prvić	Adriatic Sea	Croatia
Pryor	Ohio River, Kentucky	United States
Psara	Greek Archipelago	Greece
Psathoura	Northern Sporades	Greece
Pserimos	Dodecanese	Greece
Psili	Saronic Islands	Greece
Puerto Rico	Greater Antilles	United States
Puffin		Ireland
Puffin		Wales
Puffin		Iceland
Puffin	Alaska	United States
Puffin	Newfoundland and Labrador	Canada
Puget	Columbia River, Washington	United States
Puka-Puka	Disappointment Islands, Tuamotus, French Polynesia	France
Pukapuka	Cook Islands	New Zealand
Pukarua	Tuamotus, French Polynesia	France
Pulau Adonara	Malay Archipelago	Indonesia
Pulau Alor	Malay Archipelago	Indonesia
Pulau Aman	Penang	Malaysia
Pulau Atauro	Malay Archipelago	East Timor
Pulau Besar	Malacca	Malaysia
Pulau Besar	Johor	Malaysia
Pulau Betong	Penang	Malaysia
Pulau Carey	Selangor	Malaysia
Pulau Galang	Riau Archipelago	Indonesia
Pulau Gedung	Johor	Malaysia
Pulau Indah	Selangor	Malaysia
Pulau Jaco	Malay Archipelago	East Timor
Pulau Ketam	Selangor	Malaysia
Pulau Kisar	Malay Archipelago	Indonesia
Pulau Klang	Selangor	Malaysia
Pulau Kombe	Malay Archipelago	Indonesia
Pulau Lomblen	Malay Archipelago	Indonesia
Pulau Melaka	Malacca	Malaysia
Pulau Obira	Malay Archipelago	Indonesia
Pulau Pantar	Malay Archipelago	Indonesia
Pulau Payar	Kedah	Malaysia
Pulau Pemanggil	Johor	Malaysia
Pulau Rawa	Johor	Malaysia
Pulau Romang	Malay Archipelago	Indonesia
Pulau Roti	Malay Archipelago	Indonesia
Pulau Semau	Malay Archipelago	Indonesia
Pulau Sibu	Johor	Malaysia
Pulau Solor	Malay Archipelago	Indonesia
Pulau Tengah	Johor	Malaysia
Pulau Tenggol		Malaysia
Pulau Tiga	Sabah	Malaysia
Pulau Tikus	Penang	Malaysia
Pulau Tinggi	Johor	Malaysia
Pulau Wetar		Indonesia
Pullen	New Jersey	United States
Puná	Gulf of Guayaquil	Ecuador
Pulincunnu	Pamba River, Kerala	India
Psyttaleia	Saronic Islands	Greece
Pyramid	Nevada	United States

== See also ==
- List of islands (by country)
- List of islands by area
- List of islands by population
- List of islands by highest point
