= List of islands of Poland =

This is a list of islands of Poland (Polish: Wyspy).

== Baltic Sea ==
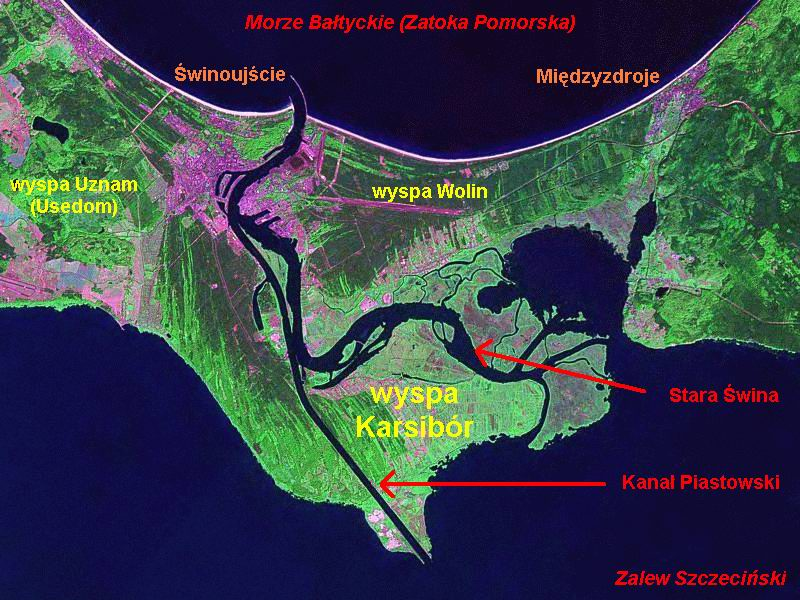
Canals of Usedom

The following Polish islands are in the Baltic Sea:

- Usedom, 53°56′00″N 14°05′00″E
- Wolin, 53°55′00″N 14°30′00″E
- Wolińska Kępa, 53°50′31″N 14°37′17″E

== Oder Lagoon ==
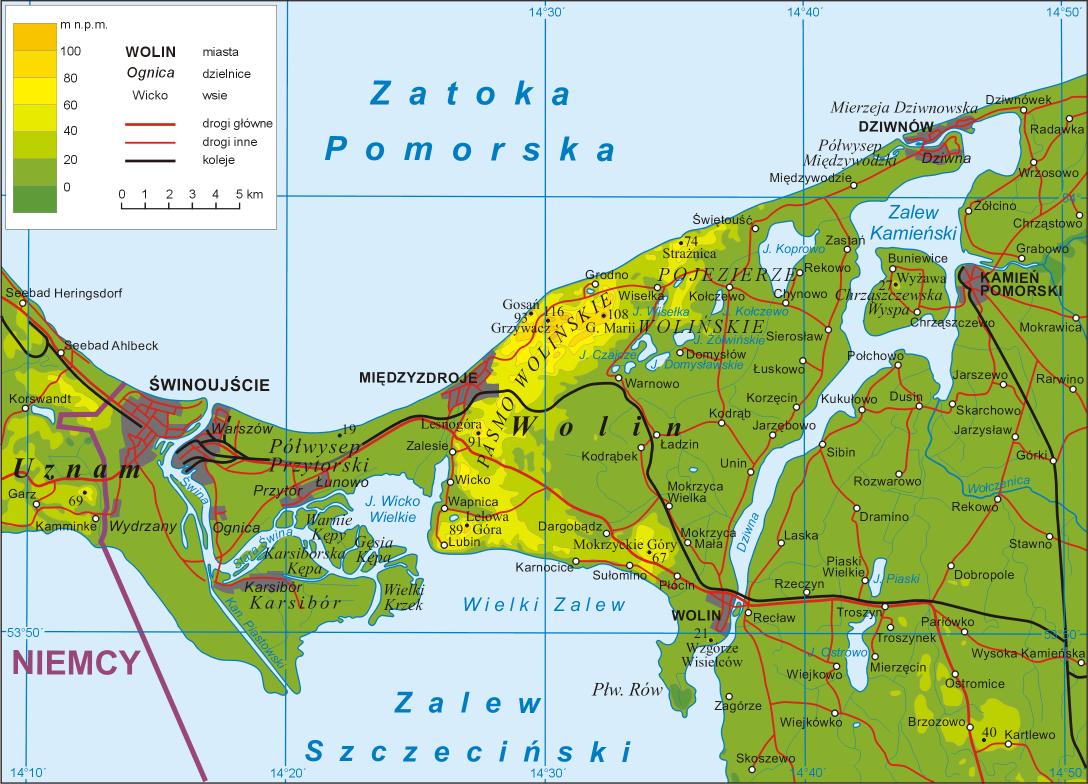
Warnie Kępy north-east of Karsibór Island

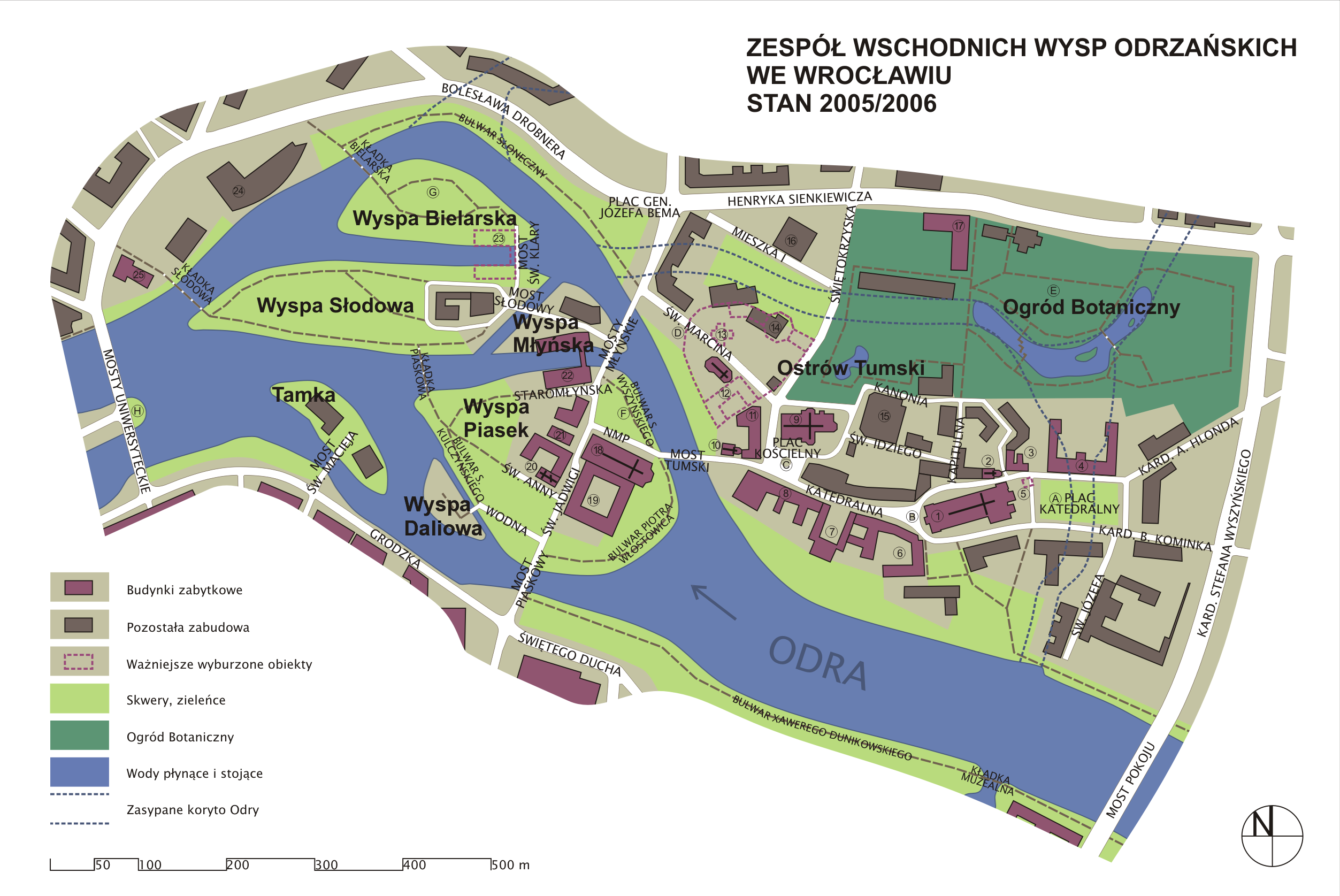
Islands of Wrocław

The following Polish islands are in the Oder Lagoon:

- Chełminek, 53°40′28″N 14°31′51″E
- Chrząszczewska Island, 53°58′00″N 14°44′00″E
- Gęsia Kępa, 53°51′39″N 14°22′08″E
- Karsibór, 53°50′46″N 14°19′48″E
- Koński Smug, 53°53′00″N 14°21′22″E
- Trzcinice
- Warnie Kępy, 53°52′05″N 14°21′45″E
- Wielki Krzek, 53°51′04″N 14°24′09″E
- Wiszowa Kępa, 53°51′55″N 14°24′03″E
- Wydrza Kępa, 53°52′41″N 14°20′32″E

== Other Oder islands ==
- Islands of Wrocław
  - Tamka, 51°06′54″N 17°02′14″E
  - Malt Island (Wyspa Słodowa), 51°06′59″N 17°02′15″E
  - Bielarska Island (Wyspa Bielarska), 51°07′02″N 17°02′18″E
  - Mill Island (Wyspa Młyńska), 51°06′58″N 17°02′25″E
  - Daliowa Island (Wyspa Daliowa), 51°06′52″N 17°02′19″E
  - Sand Island (Wyspa Piasek), 51°06′53″N 17°02′26″E

== Islands of Gdańsk Bay and Vistula Lagoon ==
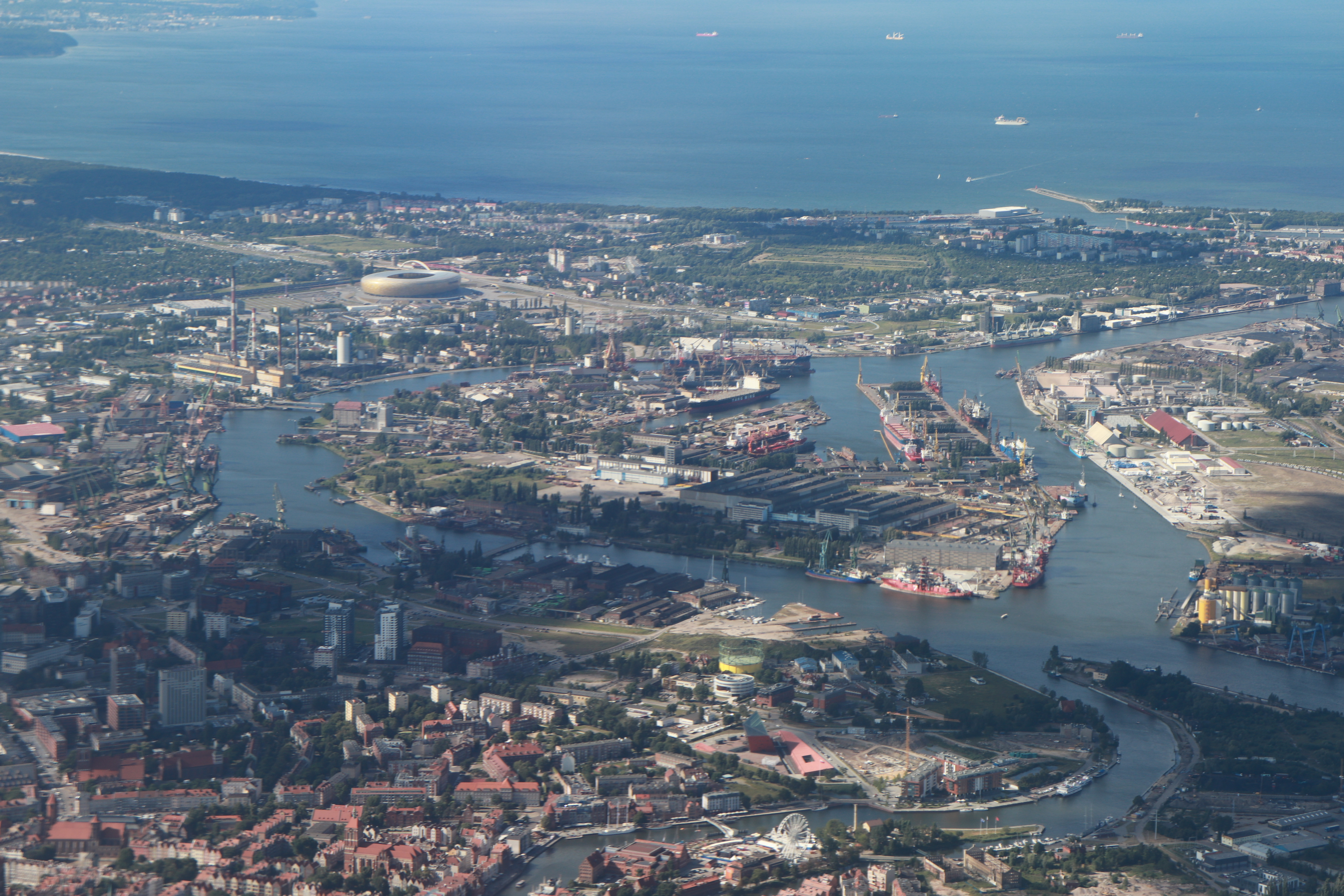
Aerial view of Ostrów Island

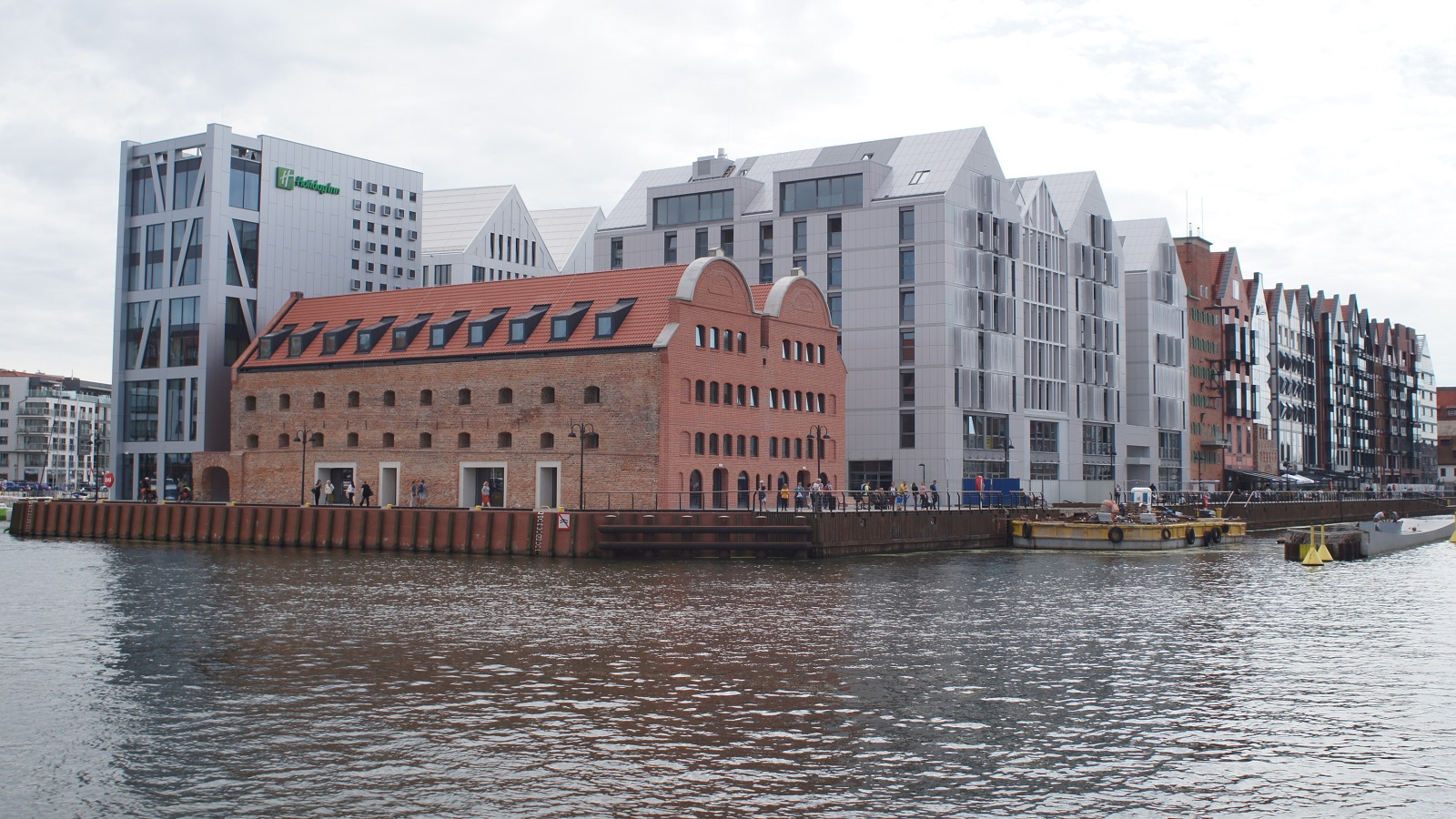
Granary Island in Gdańsk

The following Polish islands are in the Gdańsk Bay and Vistula Lagoon:

- Aestian Island (artificial island in the Vistula Lagoon), approximately 54°21′29″N 19°30′44″E
- Islands of Gdańsk
  - Port Island Area: 25.7 km² population 22,167 people, 54°22′52″N 18°43′23″E
  - Sobieszewo Island Area: 34.3 km² population: 3,570 people, 54°20′11″N 18°52′29″E
  - Ostrów Island (Holm Island), 54°22′16″N 18°39′14″E
  - Granary Island (Wyspa Spichrzów), 54°20′47.32″N 18°39′27.58″E
- Granary Island (Wyspa Spichrzów) in Elbląg, 54°09′30″N 19°23′19″E

== Other ==
- Grodzka Island (uninhabited island on the Oder River in Szczecin), 53°26′00″N 14°34′00″E
- Ostrów Mieleński, 53°25′01″N 14°35′56″E
- Upałty, 54°10′29″N 21°40′20″E
- Wielka Żuława (on Lake Jeziorak), 53°36′36″N 19°33′00″E

== See also ==
- List of rivers of Poland
- List of islands in the Baltic Sea
- List of islands
- pl:Lista wysp Polski
