= Grape Island =

Grape Island may refer to

- Grape Island (West Virginia), in the Ohio River
- Grape Island, West Virginia, an unincorporated community in Pleasants County, West Virginia
- Grape Island (Lake Michigan), part of the Beaver Island (Lake Michigan) archipelago
- Grape Island (Norfolk County, Massachusetts), one of the Boston Harbor Islands
- Grape Island (Essex County, Massachusetts), Plum Island Sound, Ipswich, Massachusetts
- Grape Island (Lake Simcoe), Ontario, Canada
