= List of islands of West Virginia =

This is a list of islands of West Virginia.

Islands of West Virginia
Island	River
Babbs Island	Ohio River
Blaine Island	Kanawha River
Blennerhassett Island	Ohio River
Boggs Island	Ohio River
Broadback Island	Ohio River
Brooks Island	New River
Browns Island	Ohio River
Buckley Island	Ohio River
Buffington Island	Ohio River
Bushes Island	New River
Captina Island	Ohio River
Cluster Islands	Ohio River
Coney Island	New River
Coon Bone Island	Laurel Fork
Crab Island	Ohio River
Eightmile Island	Ohio River
Eureka Island	Ohio River
First Brother Island	Ohio River
Fish Creek Island	Ohio River
Gallipolis Island	Ohio River
Grandview Island	Ohio River
Grape Island	Ohio River
Griffen Island	Ohio River
Hatfield Island	Guyandotte River
Johnson Island	Greenbrier River
The Jug	Middle Island Creek
Letart Island	Ohio River
Lower Twin Island	Ohio River
Magic Island	Kanawha River
Middle Island	Ohio River
Mill Creek Island	Ohio River
Muskingum Island	Ohio River
Mustapha Island	Ohio River
Neal Island	Ohio River
Paden Island	Ohio River
Piss Pot Island	South Branch Potomac River
Poplar Island	Tygart Valley River
Robertson Island	Tygart Valley River
Scotts Island	Kanawha River
Scout Island	Tygart Valley River
Seven Islands	Cheat River
Steer Island	New River
Tyler Island	Kanawha River
Upper Twin Island	Ohio River
Valley View Island	South Branch Potomac River
Vienna Island	Ohio River
Virginius Island	Shenandoah River
Wells Island	Ohio River
Wheeler Islands	Kanawha River
Wheeling Island	Ohio River
Williamson Island	Ohio River
Wilson Island	Kanawha River
Witten Towhead	Ohio River
Wylie Island	New River

== Former islands ==
- Baker Island (Ohio River)

== See also ==
- List of islands on the Potomac River
