= Johnson Island =

Johnson Island may refer to:

- Johnson Island (Georgia), an island in Georgia
- Johnson Island (Missouri), a river island in Missouri
- Johnson Island (West Virginia), an island in West Virginia
- Johnson's Island, an island in Lake Erie in Ohio
- Johnson Island (Antarctica), an island in Antarctica

== See also ==
- Johnston Atoll, North Pacific Ocean
