= Eureka Island =

Island in West Virginia, United States

- Interactive map of Eureka Island

Geography
- Location: Ohio River
- Coordinates: 39°22′21.27″N 81°17′38.42″W

Administration
- United States
- State: West Virginia
- County: Pleasants County

Eureka Island is an island on the Ohio River in Pleasants County, West Virginia southwest of the city of Belmont and Broadback Island. It's named for the nearby West Virginia community of Eureka. The island is a part of the Ohio River Islands National Wildlife Refuge.

== See also ==
- List of islands of West Virginia
