= List of islands by name (O) =

This article features a list of islands sorted by their name beginning with the letter O.

== O ==
| Island's Name | Island group(s) | Country/Countries |
|---|---|---|
| Oʻahu | Hawaii | United States |
| Oak | Georgian Bay (Parry Sound) Ontario | Canada |
| Óbudai-sziget | Danube River | Hungary |
| Obstruction | San Juan Islands, Washington | United States |
| Oconnel | Mississippi River, Iowa | United States |
| Ocracoke | North Carolina | United States |
| Oeno | Pitcairn Islands | (United Kingdom) British overseas territories |
| Ofidoussa | | |
| Ogami Island | Miyako Islands part of the Sakishima Islands part of the Ryukyu Islands | Japan |
| Oinousses | | Greece |
| Oki daitō | Daitō Islands part of the Ryukyu Islands | Japan |
| Okikendawt | French River Ontario | Canada |
| Okinawa | Okinawa Islands part of the Ryukyu Islands | Japan |
| Okinoerabujima | Amami Islands part of the Satsunan Islands part of the Ryukyu Islands | Japan |
| Öland | North Frisian Islands | Germany |
| Öland | | Sweden |
| Oléron | | France |
| Olib | Northern Dalmatia | Croatia |
| Ombo | Ryfylke Islands, Rogaland | Norway |
| Omelek | Kwajalein Atoll, Ralik Chain | Marshall Islands |
| Omø | Great Belt | Denmark |
| Omolkarm | Persian Gulf | Iran |
| Ono | Perdito River, Alabama | United States |
| Ontong Java | Solomon Islands | Solomon Islands |
| Orcas | San Juan Islands, Washington | United States |
| Öreg-sziget | Danube River | Hungary |
| Orfasay | Shetland Islands | Scotland |
| Oronsay | Inner Hebrides | Scotland |
| Orust | | Sweden |
| Izu Ōshima | Izu Islands | Japan |
| Osmussaar | Gulf of Finland | Estonia |
| Ostrów | Islands of Gdańsk | Poland |
| Othonoi | Ionian Islands | Greece |
| Otok | Bay of Kotor Islands | Montenegro |
| Out Stack | Shetland Islands | Scotland |
| Outer Duck | Lake Huron, Ontario | Canada |
| Ovau | Shortland Islands | Solomon Islands |
| Ovoa | Beira Litoral Islands | Portugal |
| Oxeia | Ionian Islands | Greece |
| Oxna | Shetland Islands | Scotland |
| Owens | Ohio River, Kentucky | United States |
| Owl | | Ireland |
| Oyster Rock | Maharashtra | India |

== See also ==
- List of islands (by country)
- List of islands by area
- List of islands by population
- List of islands by highest point
