= Brooks Island =

Brooks Island may refer to:

- Brooks Island, Bermuda
- Brooks Island Regional Preserve in Richmond, California, United States
- Brooks Island (West Virginia), United States

== See also ==
- Brook Island, Nunavut, Canada
- Brook Islands National Park, Queensland, Australia
