= Coney Island (West Virginia) =

Island in Summers County, West Virginia

- Interactive map of Coney Island

Geography
- Location: New River, West Virginia, United States
- Coordinates: 37°39′50″N 80°53′48″W

Administration
- United States

Coney Island is an island on the New River at Hinton in Summers County, West Virginia. Coney Island is located directly downstream from Bushes Island. Beech Run empties into the New River to the island's west.

== See also ==
- List of islands of West Virginia
