= Wheeler Island =

Wheeler Island may refer to:

- Wheeler Island, India
- Wheeler Island (Queensland), Australia
- Wheeler Island (California), United States
- Wheeler Island, Connecticut, United States
- Wheeler Islands (West Virginia), United States
