= Mill Creek Island =

Island in the Ohio River, West Virginia, United States

- Location within West Virginia

Geography
- Location: Ohio River, West Virginia
- Coordinates: 39°31′35″N 81°03′00″W

Administration
- United States

Mill Creek Island is a bar island on the Ohio River in Tyler County, West Virginia. The island lies upstream from Grandview Island and the towns of New Matamoras, Ohio and Friendly, West Virginia. It takes its name from Mill Creek, which empties into the Ohio River from the Ohio side in its vicinity. Mill Creek Island is protected as part of the Ohio River Islands National Wildlife Refuge.

== See also ==
- List of islands of West Virginia
