= Tyler Island =

Bar island in Kanawha county West Virginia, USA

- Interactive map of Tyler Island

Geography
- Location: Kanawha River, West Virginia
- Coordinates: 38°22′01″N 81°42′42″W

Administration
- United States

Tyler Island is a bar island in Kanawha County, West Virginia on the Kanawha River. The island lies within the city boundaries of South Charleston.

== See also ==
- List of islands of West Virginia
