= Browns Island (West Virginia) =

- Interactive map of Browns Island

Geography
- Location: Ohio River, West Virginia, United States
- Coordinates: 40°25′30″N 80°36′33″W

Administration
- United States

Browns Island is an island on the Ohio River within the corporate boundaries of Weirton in Hancock County, West Virginia. Browns Island was the site of a coke plant, which was in operation until 1982. The island's landscape is industrial with a small wooded portion at the southern tip. Griffen Island lies on the Ohio to its southwest.

Browns Island is known to be the site of an ancient Indian burial ground.

== See also ==
- List of islands of West Virginia
