= Vienna Island =

Bar island in Virginia

- Interactive map of Vienna Island

Geography
- Location: Ohio River, West Virginia
- Coordinates: 39°21′12″N 81°32′40″W

Administration
- United States

Vienna Island is a forested bar island in Wood County, West Virginia, on the Ohio River. The island lies off the shore from Vienna, West Virginia, from which it takes its name.

== See also ==
- List of islands of West Virginia
