= Blaine Island =

Island in South Charleston, West Virginia, U.S.

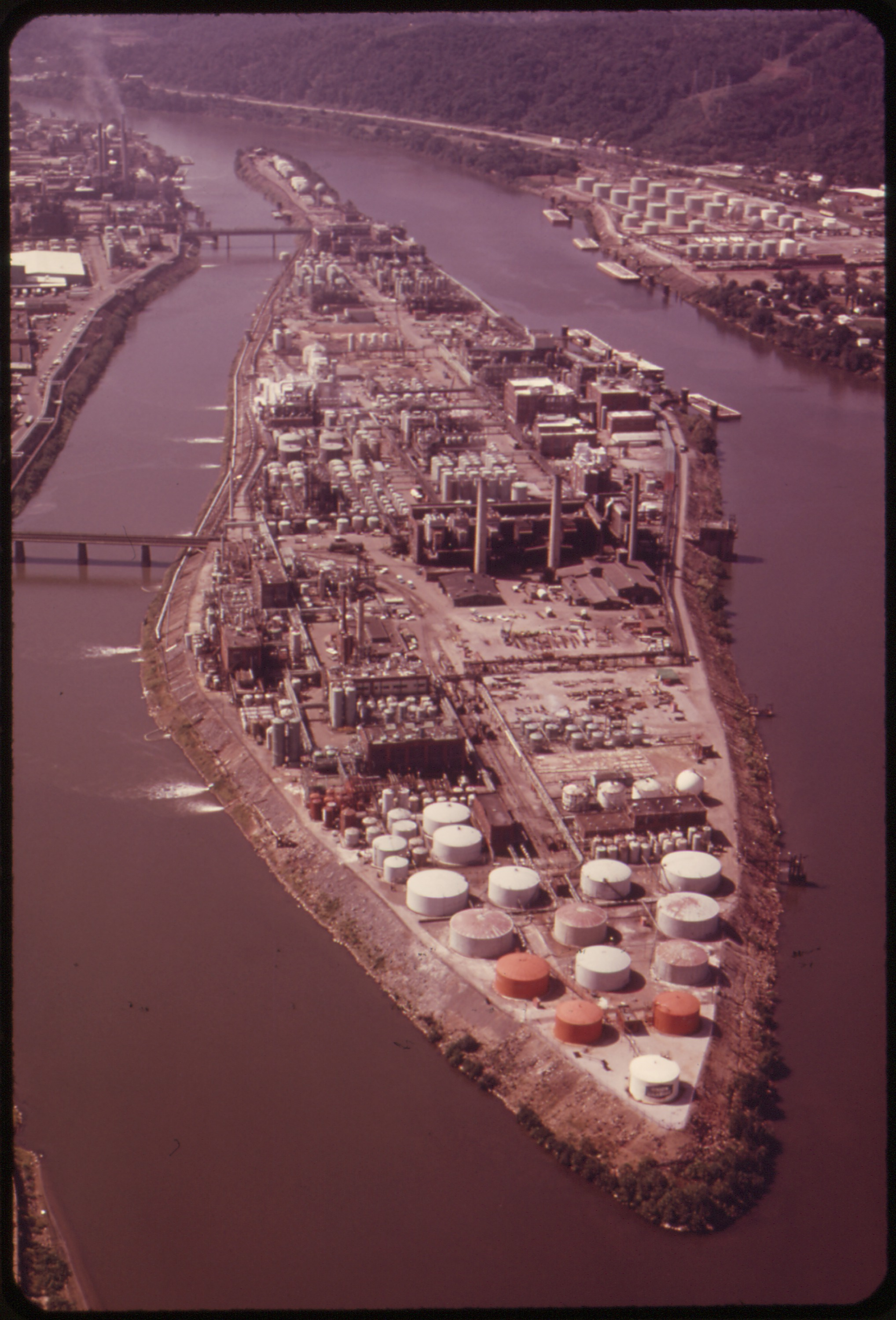
- An aerial view of Blaine Island with Union Carbide's chemical operations, September 1973

Geography
- Location: Kanawha River
- Coordinates: 38°22′11″N 81°40′55″W
- Area: 0.125 sq mi (0.32 km^{2})
- Highest elevation: 597 ft (182 m)

Administration
- United States
- State: West Virginia
- County: Kanawha
- City: South Charleston

Additional information
- Time zone: Eastern (EST) (UTC-5)
  - Summer (DST): EDT (UTC-4)
- GNIS feature ID: 1536071; Variant names: Carbide Island

Blaine Island is an island on the Kanawha River in the city of South Charleston, West Virginia. It is roughly 66 acres (270,000 m^{2}) in area with a length of 1.25 miles and about 900 feet at its widest point. Blaine Island serves as the South Charleston Manufacturing Site for the Union Carbide Corporation, a subsidiary of the Dow Chemical Company. Union Carbide purchased Blaine Island in 1927 in order to expand their petrochemical manufacturing operations in South Charleston. The company previously had petrochemical plants in South Charleston in 1925 and Clendenin in 1920, which holds the distinction as the world's first petrochemical plant.

For this reason, locals occasionally refer to the island as "Carbide Island".

Blaine Island was once called Two-Mile Island because it is two miles below the town of Charleston and located at the mouth of Two Mile Creek. It was later called Blaine's Island after the Blaine family who owned it for a one-hundred and twenty years. The original patentee was Conrod Smith, who on July 6, 1796 was granted 65A on the first large island in the Kanawha about 2 miles from the Elk River. On May 12, 1807 Conrod Smith and Ann his wife, sold his 65A tract of land known as the Big Island two miles below the mouth of the Elk River to William Blaine. He [William] built a tannery on the island and on December 8, 1821 he petitioned to build a damn and a mill. Blaine's mill was of log construction and its dam extended from the south side of the Kanawha River to the island. There is a story about Fleming Cobb, an early settler, who planted two pear trees on Blaine Island that he had brought from Tidewater Virginia in the 1780s, some of the first fruit trees known to be transplanted west of the Allegheny Mountains. The facts of the story is that Fleming Cobb came to Kanawha County in 1790 with his uncle Thomas Upton and together they began farming a tract of land at the mouth of Davis Creek, which was very near the island. Fleming Cobb inherited the Davis Creek tract in 1794 so it's entirely possible that he used the Island but he never owned it.

Today, Blaine Island is a multi-company site. Bayer Corporation owns and operates the Polyols Production Unit, formerly owned by Union Carbide. Today, Union Carbide provides staffing, services, and utilities to Bayer.

== See also ==
- List of islands of West Virginia
