= Griffen Island =

Island in Hancock County, West Virginia, United States

- Interactive map of Griffen Island

Geography
- Location: Ohio River, West Virginia
- Coordinates: 40°24′36″N 80°36′42″W

Administration
- United States

Griffen Island is a bar in the Ohio River located along the southwestern side of Browns Island near Weirton in Hancock County, West Virginia. It has also been known throughout its history as Hop Island.

== See also ==
- List of islands of West Virginia
