= Letart Island =

Island on the Ohio River in West Virginia

- Location within West Virginia

Geography
- Location: Ohio River, West Virginia
- Coordinates: 38°53′12″N 81°55′34″W

Administration
- United States

Letart Island is a forested bar island on the Ohio River in Mason County, West Virginia. It is located between the towns of Letart, West Virginia and Letart Falls, Ohio. Letart Island is a part of the Ohio River Islands National Wildlife Refuge.

== See also ==
- List of islands of West Virginia
