= Steer Island =

- Interactive map of Steer Island

Geography
- Location: New River, West Virginia
- Coordinates: 37°32′24.43″N 80°53′34.30″W
- Highest elevation: 433 m (1421 ft)

Administration
- United States

Steer Island is a former bar island in Summers County, West Virginia, on the New River in the United States. Steer Island was submerged after the creation of Bluestone Lake on the river.

== See also ==
- List of islands of West Virginia
