= Fish Creek Island =

Island in West Virginia, United States

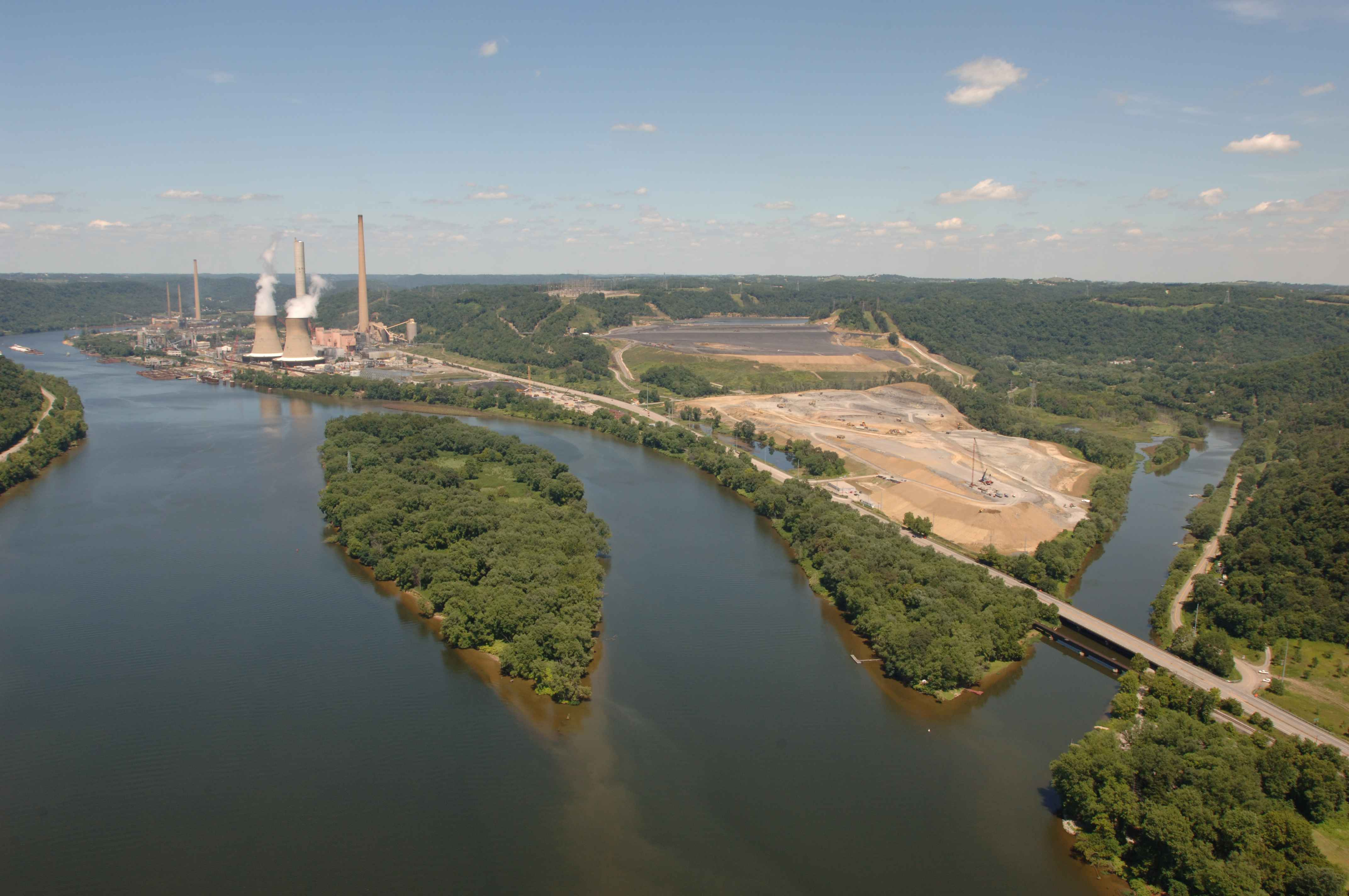
- Fish Creek Island (center left)

- Location within West Virginia

Geography
- Location: Ohio River, West Virginia
- Coordinates: 39°48′52″N 80°49′06″W
- Area: 0.075 sq mi (0.19 km^{2})

Administration
- United States

Fish Creek Island is a 48-acre (19-hectare) island on the Ohio River in Marshall County, West Virginia, United States. The island is located across the river from Captina, West Virginia, south of Moundsville, and north of the mouth of Fish Creek, from which it takes its name.

Previously owned by CONSOL Energy Inc., Fish Creek Island was donated by CONSOL to the Nature Conservancy to protect the island's habitat for its rare great blue herons. The bar is West Virginia's largest great blue heron rookery. The Nature Conservancy turned over Fish Creek Island to the Ohio River Islands National Wildlife Refuge which is now a protected island of the reserve.

== See also ==
- List of islands of West Virginia
