= Williamson Island =

- Location within West Virginia

Geography
- Location: Ohio River, West Virginia
- Coordinates: 39°35′37″N 80°57′28″W

Administration
- United States

Williamson Island is a bar island on the Ohio River in Tyler County, West Virginia. It lies to the southwest of Paden City with Witten Towhead (once part of Williamson Island) directly downstream. Along with Witten Towhead, Williamson Island is a part of the Ohio River Islands National Wildlife Refuge.

In 1817, John Buck settled in Tyler County and executed a lease on Williamson Island. This is the first recorded entry of the Buck surname in Tyler County. The mountain to its east, Buck Knob, takes its name from the island's Buck family.

== See also ==
- List of islands of West Virginia
