= Baker Island (West Virginia) =

Geography
- Location: Ohio River
- Coordinates: 40°35′09″N 80°39′42″W
- Highest elevation: 663 ft (202.1 m)

Administration
- United States
- State: West Virginia
- County: Hancock
- Magisterial District: Grant

Additional information
- Time zone: Eastern (EST) (UTC-5)
  - Summer (DST): EDT (UTC-4)
- GNIS feature ID: 1550006; Variant names: Baker's Island; Bakers Island

Baker Island is a former island on the Ohio River in Hancock County in the U.S. state of West Virginia. It was located directly west of the Mountaineer Casino, Racetrack and Resort in West Virginia. The island appears to have been dredged away sometime between 1960 and 1994, and no trace of it remains.

== See also ==
- List of islands of West Virginia
