= Lower Twin Island =

Island in West Virginia, United States

- Interactive map of Lower Twin Island

Geography
- Location: Ohio River, Wheeling, West Virginia
- Coordinates: 40°07′36″N 80°42′20″W
- Highest elevation: 199 m (653 ft)

Administration
- United States

Lower Twin Island is a bar island on the Ohio River in the city of Wheeling, West Virginia. Lower Twin Island and its twin, Upper Twin Island, lie northwest of Wheeling's Warwood neighborhood.

== See also ==
- List of islands of West Virginia
