= Coon Bone Island =

Island in West Virginia, U.S.

- Location within West Virginia

Geography
- Location: Laurel Fork
- Coordinates: 38°56′41″N 79°34′18″W
- Highest elevation: 2,326 ft (709 m)

Administration
- United States
- State: West Virginia
- County: Randolph

Coon Bone Island is an island in the Laurel Fork along the eastern flanks of Middle Mountain in Randolph County, West Virginia. Coon Bone Island lies within the Monongahela National Forest.

== See also ==
- List of islands of West Virginia
- Laurel Fork
