= Crab Island (West Virginia) =

Island on the Ohio River in West Virginia

- Location within West Virginia

Geography
- Location: Ohio River, West Virginia, United States
- Coordinates: 39°33′35″N 81°00′25″W

Administration
- United States

Crab Island is a small island on the Ohio River in Tyler County, West Virginia. The island lies just off the shore from the city of Sistersville. Crab Island is protected as part of the Ohio River Islands National Wildlife Refuge.

== See also ==
- List of islands of West Virginia
