= Upper Twin Island =

- Interactive map of Upper Twin Island

Geography
- Location: Ohio River, Wheeling, West Virginia
- Coordinates: 40°08′04″N 80°42′27″W

Administration
- United States

Upper Twin Island is a bar island in Ohio County, West Virginia on the Ohio River. It lies upstream from its twin, Lower Twin Island. Both islands are part of the city of Wheeling and situated between Martins Ferry, Ohio and mainland Wheeling.

== See also ==
- List of islands of West Virginia
