= Magic Island (West Virginia) =

Island in Charleston, West Virginia

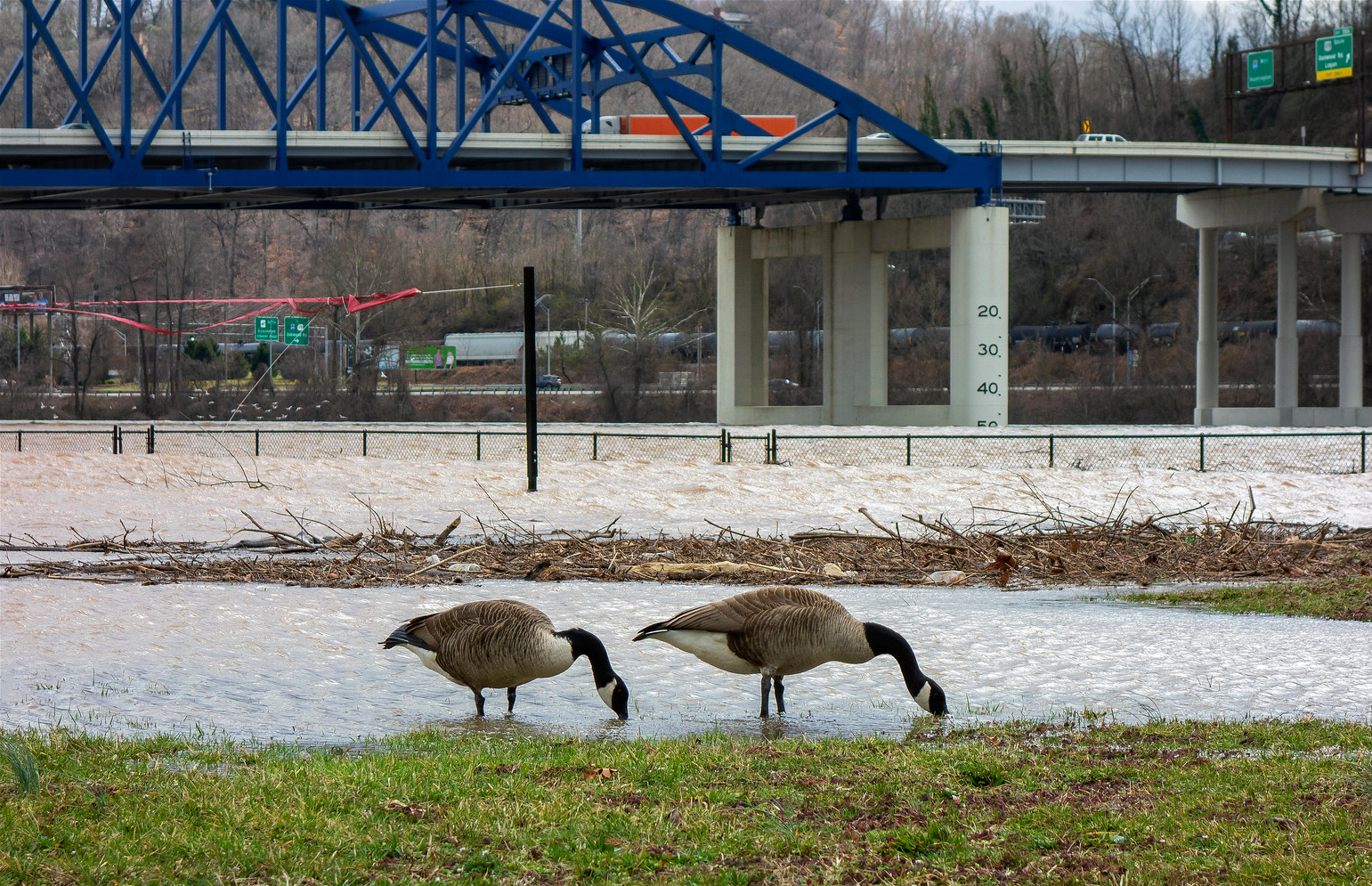
- Magic Island largely underwater during flooding in February 2019.
- Interactive map of Magic Island

Geography
- Location: Kanawha River
- Coordinates: 38°21′26″N 81°38′56″W
- Highest elevation: 581 ft (177.1 m)

Administration
- United States
- State: West Virginia
- City: Charleston

Additional information
- GNIS 1542687

Magic Island is an island (now connected to the mainland) in the Kanawha River near its confluence with the Elk River in Charleston, West Virginia. Kanawha Boulevard separates Magic Island from Charleston's West Side neighborhood. It serves as a public park for the city. The island gained its name due to the rise and fall of the river level in the Kanawha, which caused the island to slip underwater, as if by "magic".

The sandy area towards the easternmost tip of the park is known unofficially as Rockaway Beach to many of the local park revelers.

== See also ==
- List of islands of West Virginia
