= Neal Island =

- Location within West Virginia

Geography
- Location: Ohio River, West Virginia
- Coordinates: 39°18′21″N 81°33′34″W

Administration
- United States

Neal Island is a bar island on the Ohio River in Wood County, West Virginia. The island lies directly offshore from the city of Vienna. A section of Neal Island is a part of the Ohio River Islands National Wildlife Refuge.

== See also ==
- List of islands of West Virginia
