= Scout Island =

Lee Island (formerly Scout Island)
- Interactive map of Lee Island (formerly Scout Island)

Geography
- Location: Tygart Valley River, West Virginia
- Coordinates: 39°24′47″N 80°08′28″W

Administration
- United States

Lee Island is a forested bar island in Marion County, West Virginia, United States, on the Tygart Valley River.

Lee Island (formerly Scout Island) is a privately owned bar island in the Tygart River Valley. 1940s and 1950s was used by a Boy Scout troop as their private camp. Since then it is visited by scouts with permission of the current owner. A pavilion and camp sites can still be seen.

== See also ==
- List of islands of West Virginia
