= Mustapha Island =

Island in West Virginia, United States

- Interactive map of Mustapha Island

Geography
- Location: Ohio River, West Virginia
- Coordinates: 39°12′34″N 81°43′41″W

Administration
- United States

Mustapha Island is a bar island on the Ohio River in Wood County, West Virginia. It is located upstream from the Ohio's confluence with the Hocking River at Hockingport, Ohio. Locally it is known as “Sager’s Island.”

== See also ==
- List of islands of West Virginia
