= Cluster Islands =

Islands on the Ohio River in West Virginia, US

- Interactive map of Cluster Islands

Geography
- Location: Ohio River, West Virginia
- Coordinates: 40°33′33″N 80°38′30″W

Administration
- United States

Cluster Islands are islands on the Ohio River in Hancock County, West Virginia. They are located north of Moscow at the mouth of Tomlinson Run. They have also been known as Neeslys Islands.

== See also ==
- List of islands of West Virginia
