= Eightmile Island =

Island in West Virginia, United States

- Interactive map of Eightmile Island

Geography
- Location: Ohio River, West Virginia
- Coordinates: 38°56′24″N 82°06′19″W

Administration
- United States

Gordon's 1766 Colonial Patrol Map.

Eightmile Island is a forested island on the Ohio River in Mason County, West Virginia. The island is located directly across the river from the village of Cheshire, Ohio and American Electric Power Company power plant facilities there.

The map is a clip from Harry Gordon's map (c. 1766) showing the "Indian Trade" safe camp site when on the main canoe route.

== See also ==
- List of islands of West Virginia
