= Gallipolis Island =

Island in Mason County, West Virginia, United States

- Interactive map of Gallipolis Island

Geography
- Location: Ohio River, West Virginia
- Coordinates: 38°48′50″N 82°11′32″W

Administration
- United States

Gallipolis Island is an island on the Ohio River along the bank at Gallipolis, Ohio and across from Mason County, West Virginia, USA.

Although located within the boundaries of West Virginia, Gallipolis Island historically belonged to the city of Gallipolis, Ohio until the city and a private landowner, Michael Hoeft, from Milton, W.Va., donated their ownership shares of the island in 2016 to the West Virginia Land Trust.

The land trust protected the island as essential habitat for fish, mussels, birds and other animals, as well as for public recreation.

The West Virginia Land Trust intended to stabilize stream banks to keep it from eroding. The island was once more than 85 acres, but erosion reduced its size over the years to just a few acres when the West Virginia Land Trust obtained it.

Originally intending to keep the property for 10 years to complete its restoration, the West Virginia Land Trust transferred the island to the United States Fish and Wildlife Service in 2023 for its inclusion in the Ohio River Islands National Wildlife Refuge, a collection of 22 protected islands along the 362-mile stretch of the Ohio River from Pennsylvania to Kentucky.

According to information collected from Gallia County Historical Society Director Mary Lee Marchi, when the original French 500 found Gallipolis Island in 1770, they discovered wild grapes. Those grapes were then used to produce a local wine that may have been one of the town's first exported products, along with bootleg rum and whiskey.

In the 1840s, the island was turned into a kind of resort with beach access, a picnic area and a playground. In the 1860s, steamboats were made on the island.

== See also ==
- List of islands of West Virginia
