= Muskingum Island =

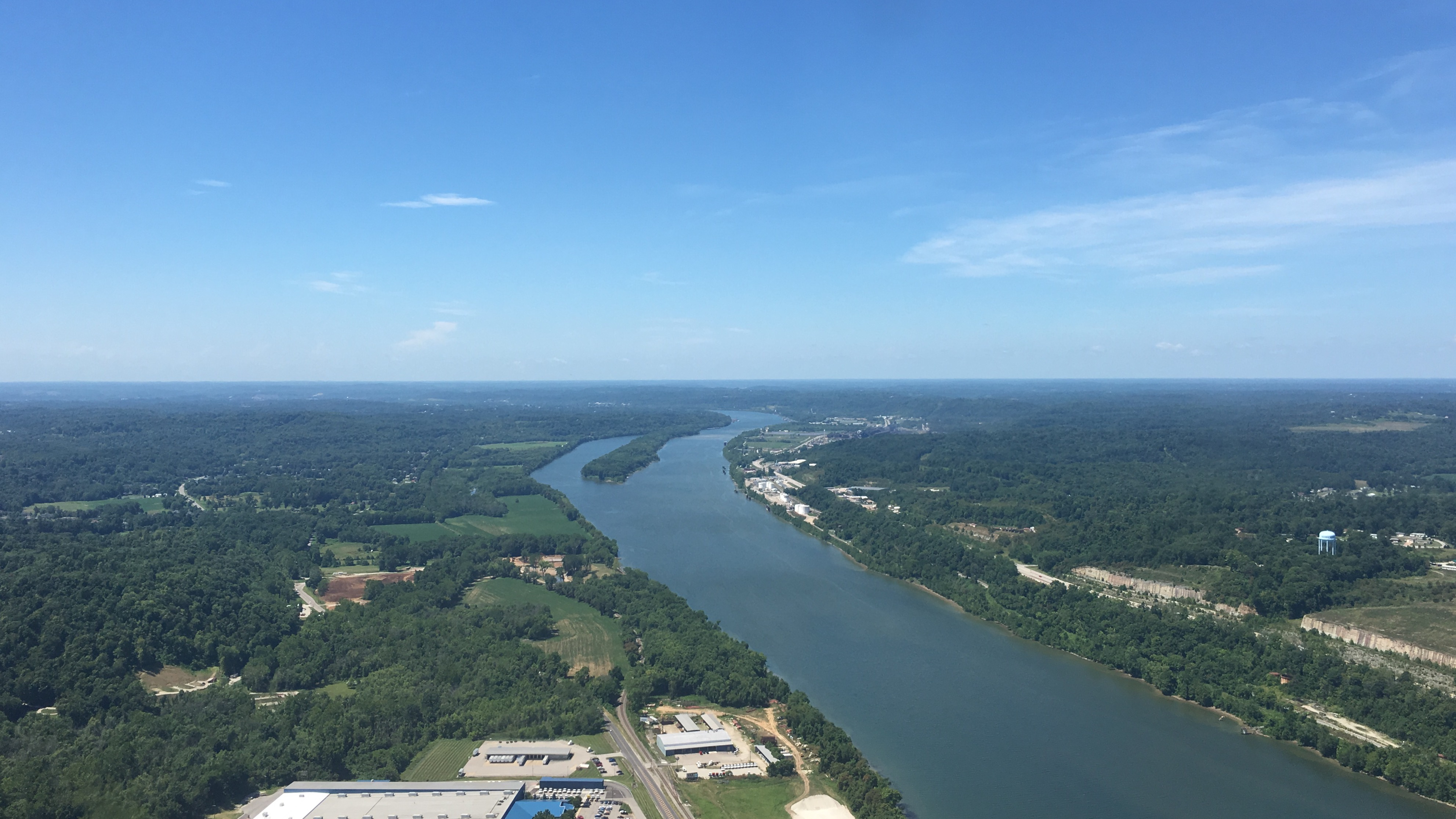
- Aerial view looking toward Muskingum Island.

- Location within West Virginia

Geography
- Location: Ohio River, West Virginia
- Coordinates: 39°22′12″N 81°30′11″W

Administration
- United States

Muskingum Island (/məˈskɪŋ(ɡ)əm/ mə-SKING-(g)əm) is a long narrow bar island on the Ohio River in Wood County, West Virginia between the towns of Moore Junction, Ohio and Boaz, West Virginia. The island is mostly covered in forests and contains a number of oil wells.

Since 1995, a site on Muskingum Island has been used as a pulse-point for the native mussel population health in the Ohio River Islands National Wildlife Refuge which the island is a part.

== See also ==
- List of islands of West Virginia
