= Seven Islands (West Virginia) =

- Interactive map of Seven Islands

Geography
- Location: Cheat River, West Virginia, United States
- Coordinates: 39°16′31″N 79°41′07″W

Administration
- United States

Seven Islands is a group of seven bar islands on the Cheat River in Preston and Tucker counties in West Virginia.

== See also ==
- List of islands of West Virginia
