= Buckley Island =

Island on the Ohio River in Wood County, West Virginia

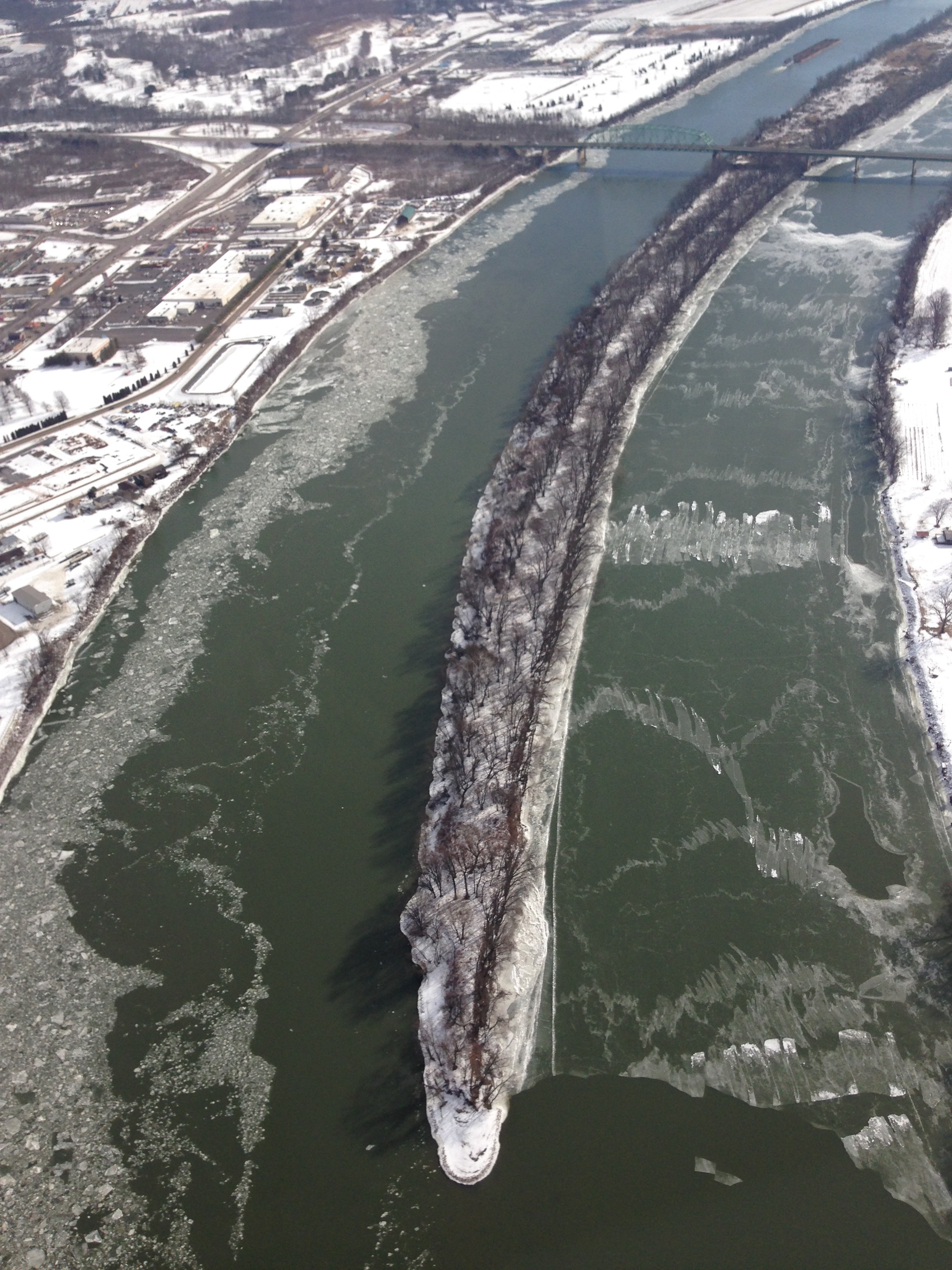
- Aerial view of Buckley Island

- Location within West Virginia

Geography
- Location: Ohio River, West Virginia
- Coordinates: 39°23′52″N 81°25′18″W
- Area: 160 acres (65 ha)
- Length: 2.6 mi (4.2 km)
- Width: 1/8 mi (0 km)

Administration
- United States

Buckley Island is an island on the Ohio River in Wood County, West Virginia between Marietta, Ohio and Williamstown, West Virginia. The Interstate 77 bridge over the Ohio crosses the island's western portion. Throughout its history, Buckley Island has also been known as Kerrs Island, Duvall Island, and Meigs Island. The island is a part of the Ohio River Islands National Wildlife Refuge and can only be accessed by boat.

The earliest known reference to the island is a 1770 journal entry by George Washington who was surveying the area at the time. In 1897, the Buckeye and Eureka Pipeline Company bought the island and turned it into an amusement park. In 1907, a flood washed away much of the park. The Buckley family bought the island in 1911 and it remained in their family until it was sold to the Fish and Wildlife Service for $400,000 in 1998.

The Muskingum River empties into the Ohio River just below Buckley Island while the Little Muskingum River empties just above it.

== See also ==
- List of islands of West Virginia
- National Wildlife Refuge System
