= Grape Island (West Virginia) =

- Location within West Virginia

Geography
- Location: Ohio River, West Virginia, United States
- Coordinates: 39°25′49″N 81°10′55″W
- Area: 0.07 sq mi (0.18 km^{2})

Administration
- United States

Grape Island is a 45-acre (180,000 m^{2}) island on the Ohio River in Pleasants County, West Virginia. The bar lies off the West Virginia coast from the communities of Grape Island and Spring Run.

The island was so named after the wild grapevines which once covered the island. Grape Island is forested, predominantly with American sycamores. The island serves as a habitat for great blue heron, wood ducks, cormorants, Canada geese, and migrating loons and tundra swans. Because of its diversity in wildlife, Grape Island is a part of the Ohio River Islands National Wildlife Refuge.

== See also ==
- List of islands of West Virginia
