= Scotts Island =

Island in Kanawha County, West Virginia, United States

Scott's Island
- Interactive map of Scott's Island

Geography
- Location: Kanawha River, West Virginia
- Coordinates: 38°13′14″N 81°31′43″W

Administration
- United States

Scott's Island is a bar island on the Kanawha River between the towns of Belle and Chesapeake in Kanawha County, West Virginia.

== See also ==
- List of islands of West Virginia
