= Boggs Island =

Island in West Virginia, United States

- Interactive map of Boggs Island

Geography
- Location: Ohio River, West Virginia
- Coordinates: 40°01′45″N 80°44′08″W

Administration
- United States

Boggs Island is an island on the Ohio River in Marshall County, West Virginia between the cities of Bellaire, Ohio and Wheeling, West Virginia. It is a small island near the Ohio shore opposite the mouth of Boggs Run, from which it may take its name. Strip mine companies removed every mature tree on this island in the 1980s.

== See also ==
- List of islands of West Virginia
