= Johnson Island (West Virginia) =

Shoal in West Virginia, U.S.

- Interactive map of Johnson Island

Geography
- Location: Greenbrier River, West Virginia
- Coordinates: 37°43′44″N 80°39′18″W

Administration
- United States

Johnson Island is a bar in the Greenbrier River at its confluence with Muddy Creek in Alderson, West Virginia, United States. The island lies in Greenbrier County, with the Alderson Federal Prison Camp located to its southwest across the county line in Summers County.

== See also ==
- List of islands of West Virginia
