= Pomona Island =

Pomona Island may refer to:

- Pomona Island, New Zealand, the largest lake island in New Zealand
- Pomona Island, Manchester, an artificial island in Manchester, England
- Mainland, Orkney, Scotland, an island also known as Pomona
