= Wylie Island =

Island on the New River in Summers County, West Virginia

- Location of Wylie Island in West Virginia

Geography
- Location: New River
- Coordinates: 37°27′22″N 80°51′59″W
- Highest elevation: 1,457 ft (444.1 m)

Administration
- United States
- State: West Virginia
- County: Summers

Additional information
- Official website: Bluestone Lake WMA

Wylie Island is a bar island on the New River in Summers County, West Virginia. It is located at Mile 20 near the very upstream end of Bluestone Lake.

Under normal conditions the island is above water, but it is subject to flooding during high water events in the Bluestone Lake pool. In drought conditions, the channel separating the island from the left-descending bank of the river sometimes dries up.

== See also ==
- Bluestone Lake Wildlife Management Area
