= Patton Island (Alabama) =

Coordinates: 34°47′40.5″N 87°39′0″W

Patton Island is an island in the Tennessee River in Lauderdale County, Alabama, in the United States.

Patton Island formed from the dredging of the Florence Canal to connect the shipping locks of Wilson Dam to the Tennessee River on the West side of Wilson Dam. The island is approximately 2.67miles (4.29 kilometers) in length and 0.31 miles (0.49 kilometers) in width at its widest point. The farthest West end of the island connects to the remnants of the Old Railroad Bridge, while the East end connects to the Wilson Dam shipping locks.

Patton Island was named for Robert M. Patton, the 20th Governor of Alabama.
