= Poplar Island (West Virginia) =

Island in Marion County, West Virginia

- Interactive map of Poplar Island

Geography
- Location: Tygart Valley River
- Coordinates: 39°25′04″N 80°08′48″W
- Highest elevation: 883 ft (269.1 m)

Administration
- United States
- State: West Virginia
- County: Marion County

Additional information
- GNIS 1545147

Poplar Island is a bar island in Marion County, West Virginia on the Tygart Valley River.

== See also ==
- List of islands of West Virginia
