= Klang Island =

Island in Klang District, Selangor, Malaysia

Native name: Pulau Klang ڤولاو کلڠ
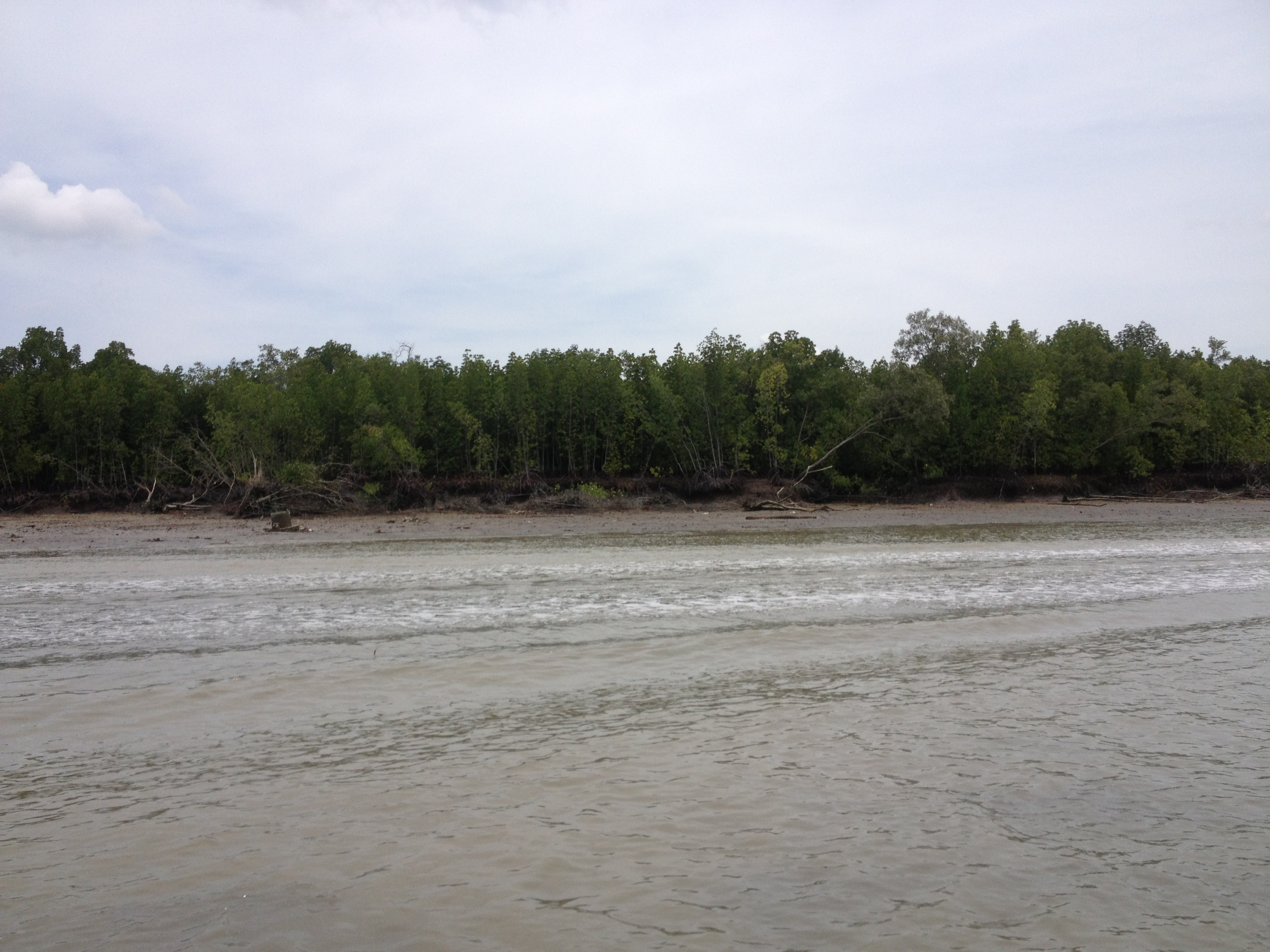
- Mangrove Swamps on the Klang Island.
- Interactive map of Klang Island

Geography
- Location: Strait of Malacca
- Coordinates: 3°00′N 101°18′E
- Area: 2.7 km^{2} (1.0 sq mi)

Administration
- Malaysia
- State: Selangor
- District: Klang
- Mukim: Klang

Klang Island (Malay: Pulau Klang is an island in Klang District, Selangor, Malaysia with an area of 2.70 km^{2}, covered by mangrove swamps. It is the largest island in the district after Indah Island, and the third-largest island of Selangor. It is currently uninhabited.

== Accessibility ==
Although the island is uninhabited, the passenger ferry line between Port Klang and Pulau Ketam would go through the island via its unnamed "river" when the tide is high, making the ferry ride a unique experience.
