= Islands of Gdańsk =

Parts of Gdańsk, Poland (also known in German as Danzig) is located on a small group of islands in the Baltic Sea. This is a comprehensive list of the islands, their area and population.

- Port Island
  - Area: 25.7 km^{2}
  - Population: 22,167 people.
- Sobieszewo Island
  - Area: 34.3 km²
  - Population: 3,570 people.
- Ostrów Island
  - Area: 2.2 km²
  - Two shipyards.
- Granary Island
  - Area: 0.24 km²
- Ołowianka

== See also ==
- List of islands of Poland
