= Warnie Kępy =

Island in Szczecin Lagoon

Coordinates: 53°52′05″N 14°21′45″E

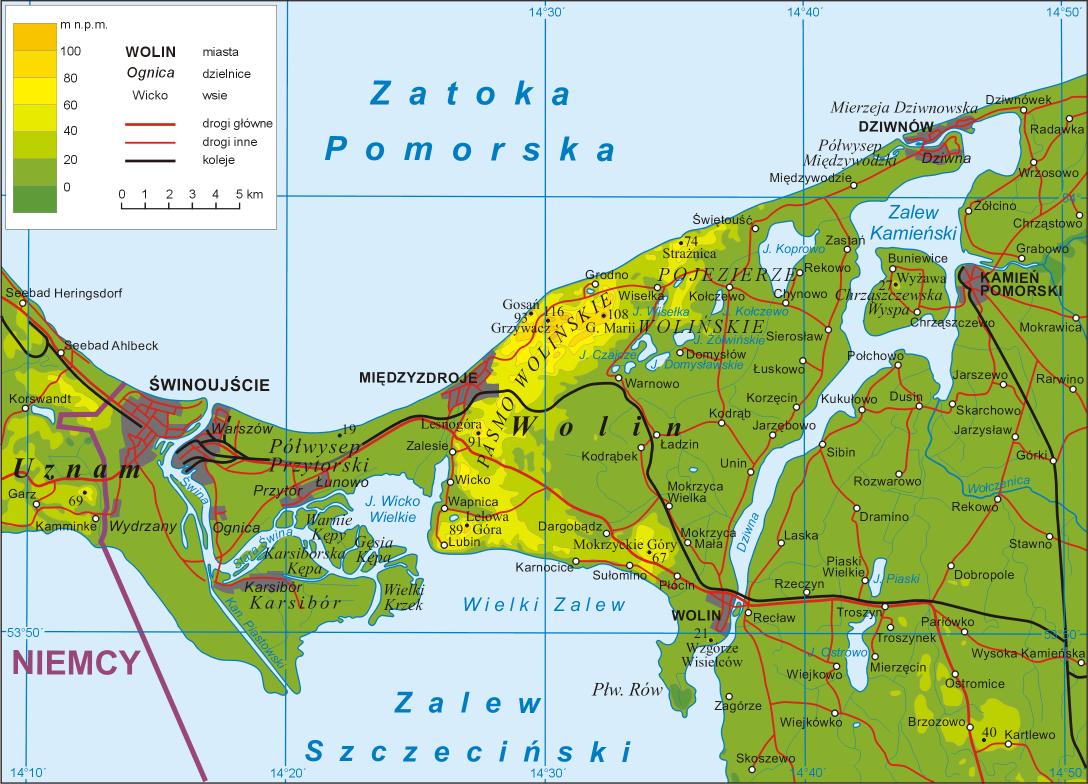
Warnie Kępy north-east of Karsibór Island

Warnie Kępy (formerly German: Warnitz-Wiesen or Warnitzwiesen) is a Polish island in Szczecin Lagoon, near Wolin. Warnie Kępy is uninhabited and has been placed under natural protection due to its many animal species and nesting grounds, especially those of birds.

== See also ==
- List of islands of Poland
