= Wolińska Kępa =

Island in Poland

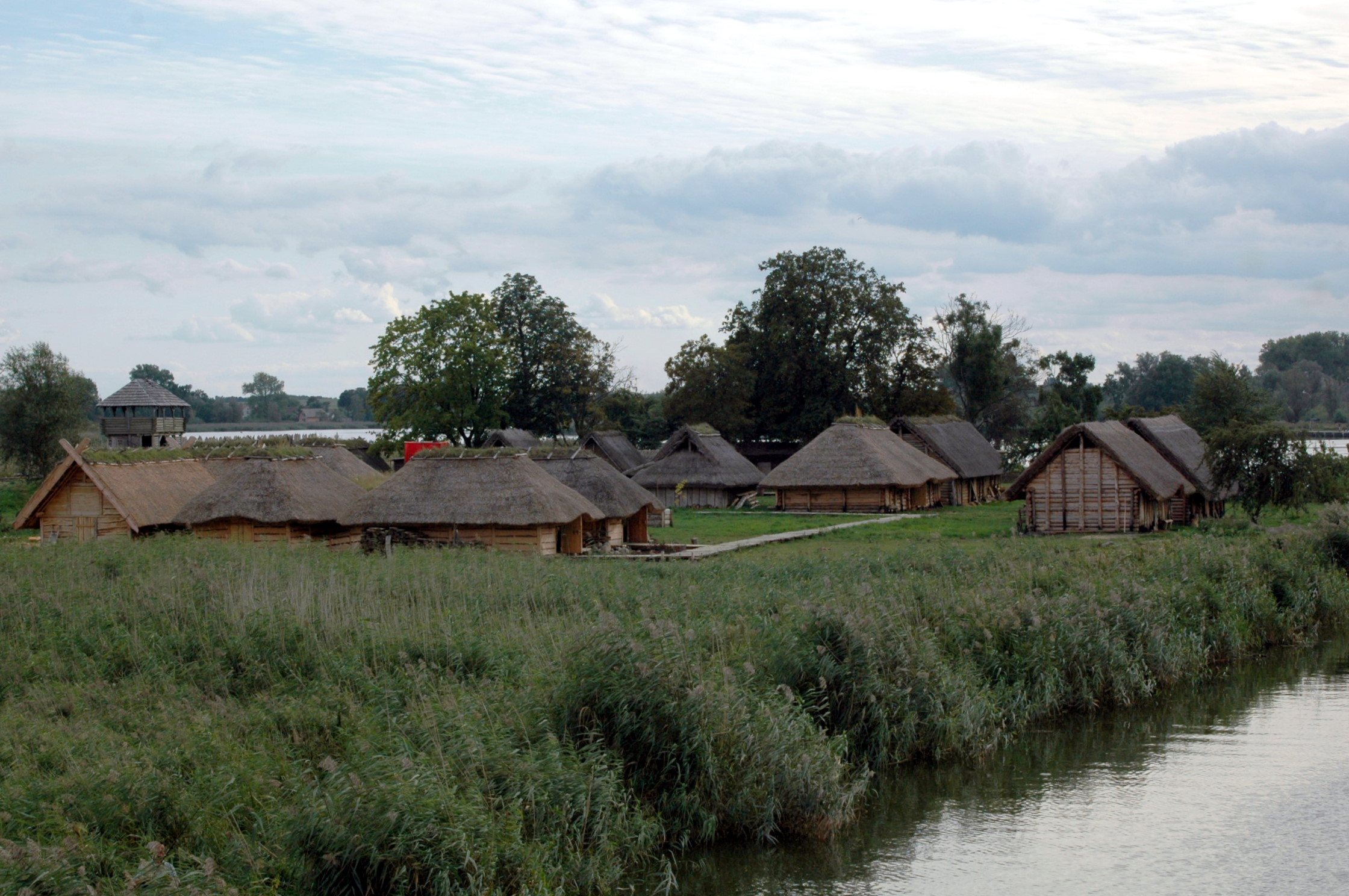
- open-air museum at the Wolińska Kępa island.

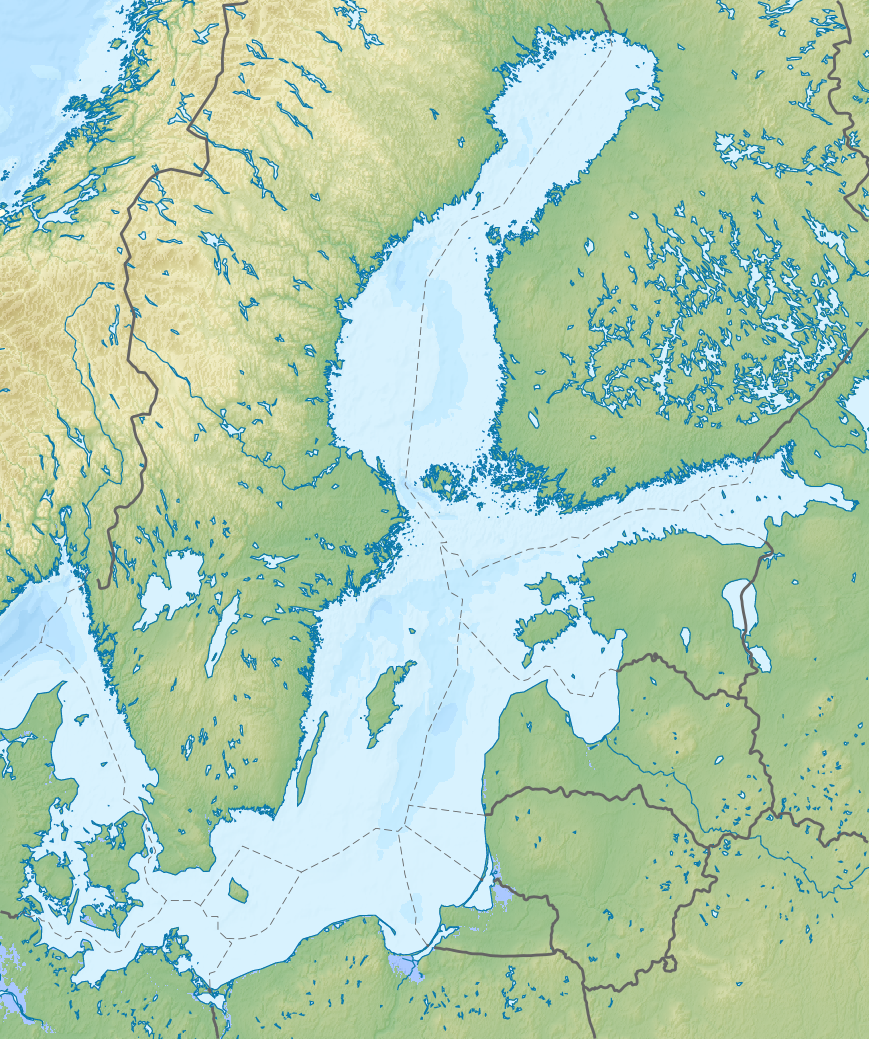
- Location within West Pomeranian Voivodeship Location within Poland Location within Baltic Sea
- Interactive map of Wolińska Kępa

Geography
- Location: Dziwna channel
- Coordinates: 53°50′31″N 14°37′17″E
- Length: 0.7 km (0.43 mi)
- Width: 0.25 km (0.155 mi)

Administration
- Poland
- Voivodeship: West Pomeranian Voivodeship
- County: Kamień

Demographics
- Ethnic groups: Poles

Additional information
- Time zone: CET (UTC+1)
  - Summer (DST): CEST (UTC+2)

Wolińska Kępa, commonly known as Ostrów, (German: Plage Wiese) is an island on the Dziwna channel in the Kamień County, West Pomeranian Voivodeship, Poland. It lies within the town limits of Wolin, between island of Wolin and mainland with the village of Recław on the coast. Length of the island is 0.7 km (0.41 mi) and width, 0.25 km (0.155 mi).

== Buildings and infrastructure ==
On the islands is located open-air museum operated by Slavs and Vikings Centre. It has a buildings referring to the architecture of early Medieval Vikings and Slavs. It is surrounded by the defensive walls and fragments of the palisade with the gate and tower. Through the island goes Zamkowa Street. It is connected with island of Wolin by one bridge, while with mainland by two. Northern part of the island, from the Zamkowa Street, is an area of bird protected area registered as Szczecin Lagoon as a pert of Natura 2000 initiative.

== Culture ==
Every year, in the first week of August, on the island is organised the Slavs and Vikings Festival in the open-air museum.
