= Bushes Island =

Island in Summers County, West Virginia

- Interactive map of Bushes Island

Geography
- Location: New River, West Virginia
- Coordinates: 37°39′24″N 80°53′26″W

Administration
- United States

Bushes Island is an island on the New River at its confluence with the Greenbrier River between Bellepoint and Hinton in Summers County, West Virginia.

== See also ==
- List of islands of West Virginia
