= Wells Island =

- Location within West Virginia

Geography
- Location: Ohio River, West Virginia
- Coordinates: 39°33′01″N 81°01′10″W

Administration
- United States

Wells Island is a bar island in Tyler County, West Virginia on the Ohio River. In 1891, the Board on Geographic Names officially decided upon Wells Island as the island's name. It lies to the southwest of Sistersville. Wells Island is protected as part of the Ohio River Islands National Wildlife Refuge.

== See also ==
- List of islands of West Virginia
