= Paden Island =

- Location within West Virginia

Geography
- Location: Ohio River, West Virginia
- Coordinates: 39°36′47″N 80°55′40″W

Administration
- United States

Paden Island is an island in Wetzel County, West Virginia on the Ohio River between Sardis, Ohio and Paden City, West Virginia. Paden Island is a part of the Ohio River Islands National Wildlife Refuge.

== See also ==
- List of islands of West Virginia
