= Grandview Island =

Island in West Virginia, United States

- Location within West Virginia

Geography
- Location: Ohio River, West Virginia
- Coordinates: 39°30′52″N 81°04′06″W

Administration
- United States

Grandview Island is an island on the Ohio River in Tyler County, West Virginia. Grandview Island lies between New Matamoras, Ohio and Friendly, West Virginia. The island takes its name from a small community to its southwest on the Ohio shore by the name of Grandview. Grandview Island is protected as part of the Ohio River Islands National Wildlife Refuge.

== See also ==
- List of islands of West Virginia
