= Johnson Island (Georgia) =

River island in Georgia, U.S.

Coordinates: 32.78182°N 85.12419°W

Johnson Island is a river island in the U.S. state of Georgia.

Johnson Island was named after Benjamin Johnson, an original owner of the site.
