= Broadback Island =

Island in West Virginia, United States

- Location within West Virginia

Geography
- Location: Ohio River, West Virginia
- Coordinates: 39°22′54″N 81°16′22″W

Administration
- United States

Broadback Island is an island in the Ohio River in Pleasants County, West Virginia. It is opposite the city of Belmont, West Virginia. Broadback Island is a part of the Ohio River Islands National Wildlife Refuge. The island is popular with bird watchers because it serves as a good place to scan for osprey and bald eagles. Along with First Brother Island, closer to the Belmont shore, it is sometimes referred to as Second Brother Island.

== See also ==
- List of islands of West Virginia
