= Ohio River Islands National Wildlife Refuge =

Park in the United States of America

- IUCN category IV (habitat/species management area)
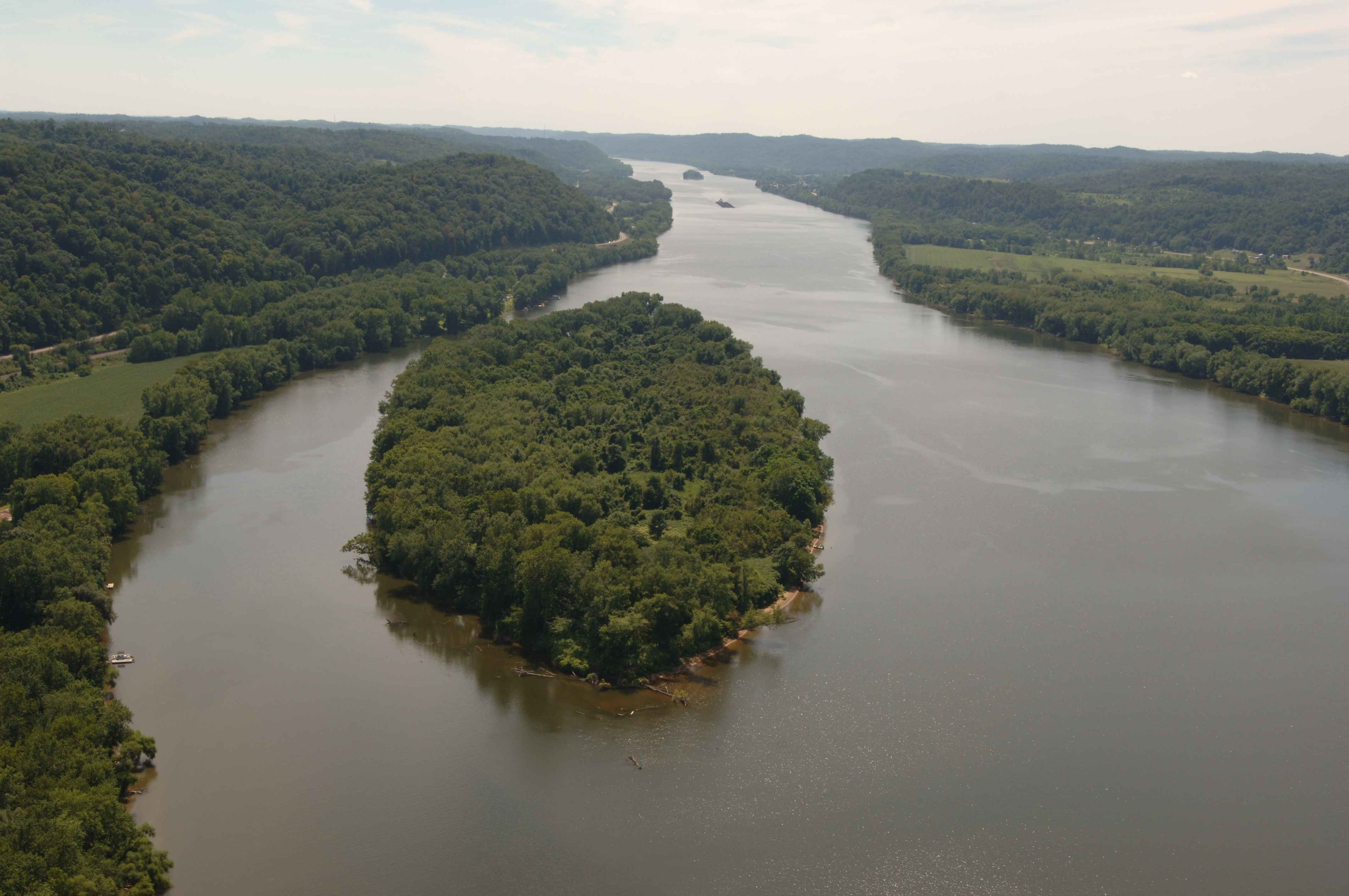
- Aerial view of one islands of the refuge

- Location within the United States Location within West Virginia
- Location: Ohio River, Kentucky, Pennsylvania, West Virginia, United States
- Nearest city: Williamstown, West Virginia
- Coordinates: 39°23′28″N 81°25′15″W
- Area: 3,354 acres (13.57 km^{2})
- Established: 1990
- Governing body: U.S. Fish and Wildlife Service
- Website: Ohio River Islands National Wildlife Refuge

The Ohio River Islands National Wildlife Refuge (ORINWR) is a National Wildlife Refuge (NWR) in non-contiguous sites consisting of islands along 362 miles (583 km) of the Ohio River, primarily (85% of acreage) in the U.S. state of West Virginia.

There are also two islands that are located upstream in Beaver County, Pennsylvania, and a pair that are located downstream in Lewis County, Kentucky.

Looking downstream, the refuge is currently located in parts of these counties: Beaver, Brooke, Ohio, Marshall, Wetzel, Tyler, Pleasants, Wood, Jackson, Mason, and Lewis. All counties are part of West Virginia, with the Pennsylvania and Kentucky exceptions that are mentioned above.

== History ==
The ORINWR was established in 1990 and consists of 3,354 acres (13.57 km^{2}) of land and underwater habitat on twenty-two islands and four mainland properties.

The refuge headquarters with visitor center is located in Williamstown, West Virginia.

== Islands ==
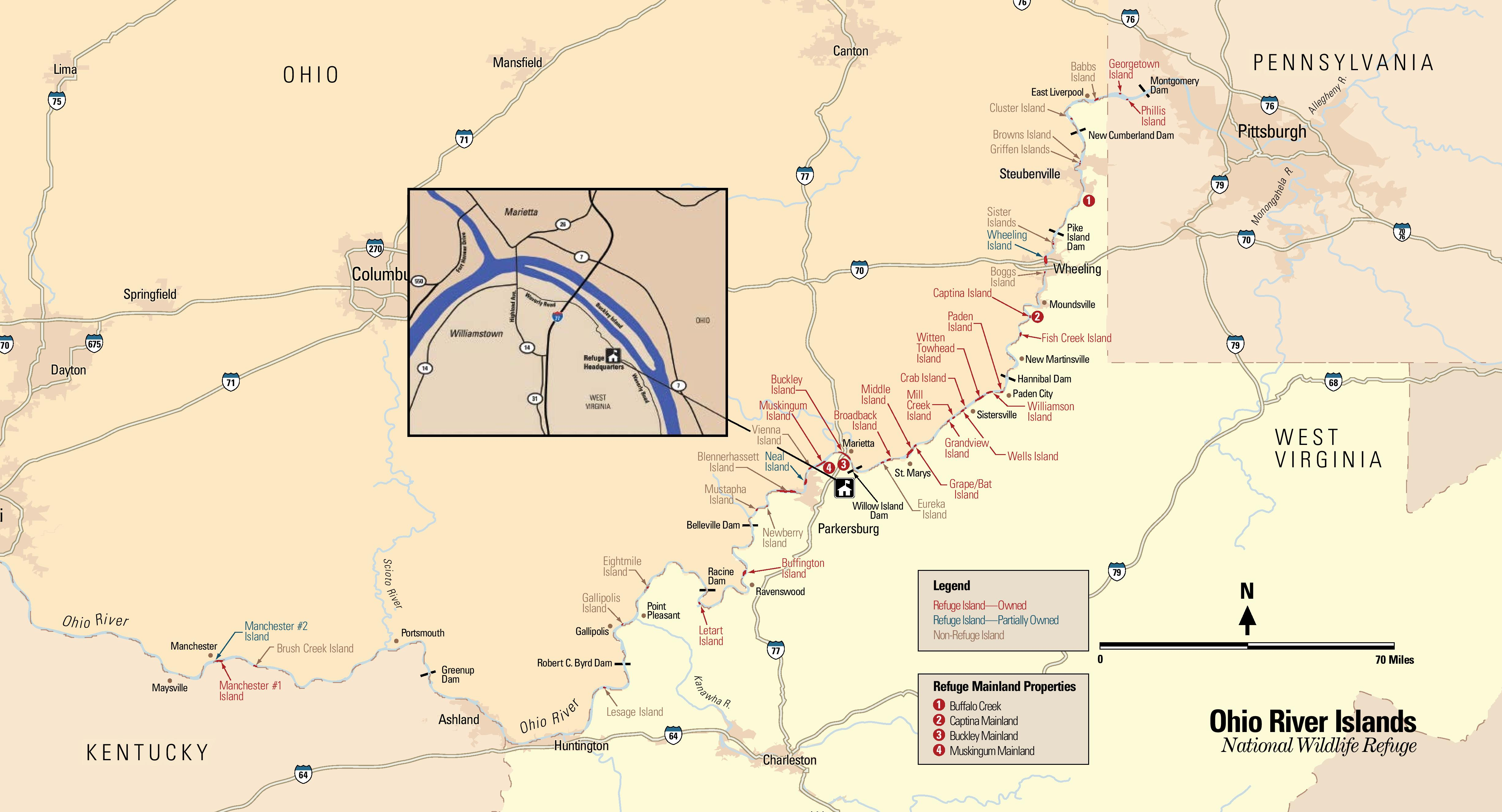
Map

The following islands in the Ohio River are part of the Ohio River Islands National Wildlife Refuge. All are located in West Virginia unless indicated otherwise.

- Phillis Island (Pennsylvania)
- Georgetown Island (Pennsylvania)
- Wheeling Island – part
- Captina Island
- Fish Creek Island
- Paden Island
- Williamson Island
- Witten Towhead
- Crab Island
- Wells Island
- Mill Creek Island
- Gallipolis Island
- Grandview Island
- Grape Island
- Middle Island
- Broadback Island
- Buckley Island
- Muskingum Island
- Neal Island – part
- Buffington Island
- Letart Island
- Manchester 1 Island (Kentucky)
- Manchester 2 Island (Kentucky) - part
