= Wislow Island =

Island in Alaska, United States

Coordinates: 54°00′30″N 166°43′27″W

Location in Alaska

Wislow Island is an island in the Fox Islands group of the eastern Aleutian Islands in the U.S. state of Alaska. It is 520 feet (160 m) across and situated in Reese Bay midway between Capes Wislow and Cheerful on the north coast of Unalaska Island, 11.3 miles (18.2 km) northwest of Dutch Harbor. It was named in 1888 by the U.S. Bureau of Fisheries.
