= Wilson Island (West Virginia) =

Island in Charleston, West Virginia, USA

- Interactive map of Wilson Island

Geography
- Location: Kanawha River, West Virginia
- Coordinates: 38°21′42″N 81°43′18″W
- Highest elevation: 587 ft (178.9 m)

Administration
- United States
- State: West Virginia
- City: South Charleston

Additional information
- GNIS 1549226

Wilson Island is a bar island on the Kanawha River in South Charleston, West Virginia. I-64's bridge over the Kanawha River into the city crosses over the island.

== See also ==
- List of islands of West Virginia
