= Brooks Island (West Virginia) =

Island in West Virginia, United States

- Interactive map of Brooks Island

Geography
- Location: New River, West Virginia, United States
- Coordinates: 37°43′53″N 80°54′18″W
- Length: 1 mi (2 km)

Administration
- United States

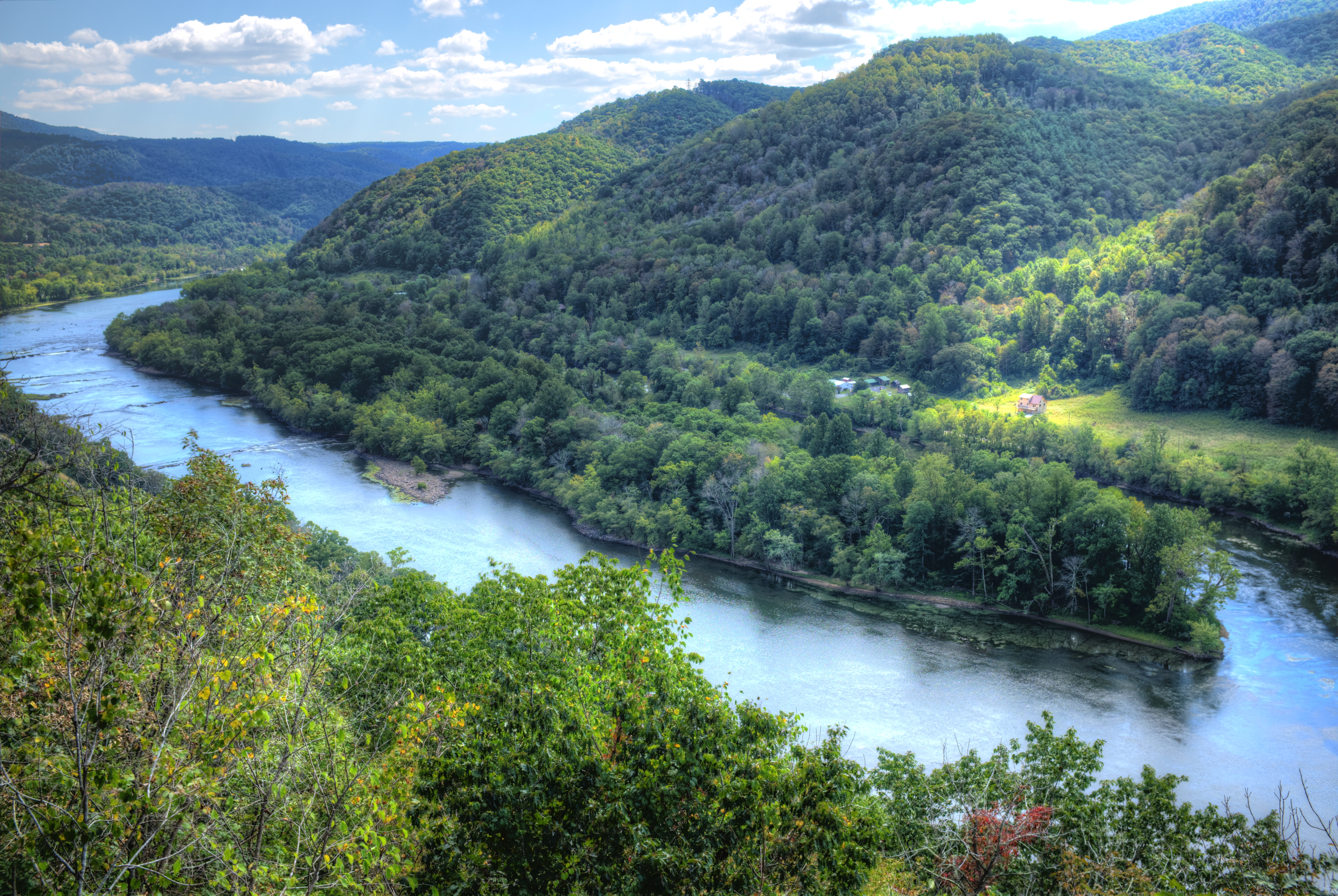
Brooks Island, West Virginia

Brooks Island is an island in Raleigh County, West Virginia on the New River. It is located between Brooks Falls and Sandstone Falls, near the unincorporated community of Brooks.

Brooks Island has been a perennial nesting place for bald eagles since 2010. It is located within the New River Gorge National Park and Preserve.

== See also ==
- List of islands of West Virginia
