= Wheeler Islands (West Virginia) =

- Interactive map of Wheeler Islands

Geography
- Location: Kanawha River, West Virginia, United States
- Coordinates: 38°09′38″N 81°18′08″W

Administration
- United States

Wheeler Islands are bar islands in Fayette County, West Virginia (USA) on the Kanawha River. The islands lie to the south of Longacre and to the north of Boomer. The islands are located within the city limits of Smithers.

== See also ==
- List of islands of West Virginia
