= Witten Towhead =

River island in West Virginia, US

- Location within West Virginia Location within the United States

Geography
- Location: Ohio River
- Coordinates: 39°35′09″N 80°58′19″W

Administration
- United States
- West Virginia
- Tyler County

Witten Towhead is a bar island or "towhead" (river island) on the Ohio River in Tyler County, West Virginia. It is located to the southwest of Paden City. Witten Towhead is a part of the Ohio River Islands National Wildlife Refuge.

== See also ==
- List of islands of West Virginia
