= Piss Pot Island =

Island in the Potomac River, West Virginia, United States

- Piss Pot Island on the 1755 Carte de la Virginie et du Maryland
- Interactive map of Piss Pot Island

Geography
- Location: South Branch Potomac River, West Virginia
- Coordinates: 39°20′06″N 78°46′52″W

Administration
- United States

Piss Pot Island is an island on the South Branch Potomac River west of Romney in Hampshire County, West Virginia. It first appeared on Joshua Fry and Peter Jefferson's map of Virginia and Maryland in 1751.

Piss Pot Island received its name before 1755, the year it was included on Fry and Jefferson's Carte de la Virginie et du Maryland. Uncommon for islands of its size and geologic nature, Piss Pot Island has remained approximately the same size since the eighteenth century. The island is forested primarily with American sycamores and silver maples. It continues to be popular with fishermen and canoers on the South Branch Potomac River. Mill Creek empties into the South Branch to its western shore and Wergman Run enters the river to its northeast.

Piss Pot Island is currently owned by the Williams family of Sycamore Dale, the historic brick plantation house located to its east on South Branch River Road (County Route 8). It is easily viewed from the Northwestern Turnpike (U.S. Route 50) in Vanderlip and the Romney Bridge.
