= Grape Island, West Virginia =

Grape Island
- Unincorporated community
- Location within the state of West Virginia Grape Island (the United States)
- Coordinates: 39°25′17″N 81°10′54″W
- Country: United States
- State: West Virginia
- County: Pleasants
- Elevation: 640 ft (200 m)
- Time zone: UTC-5 (Eastern (EST))
  - Summer (DST): UTC-4 (EDT)
- GNIS ID: 1554593

Grape Island is an unincorporated community in Pleasants County, West Virginia, United States.
