= Wielki Krzek =

Island in the Szczecin Lagoon

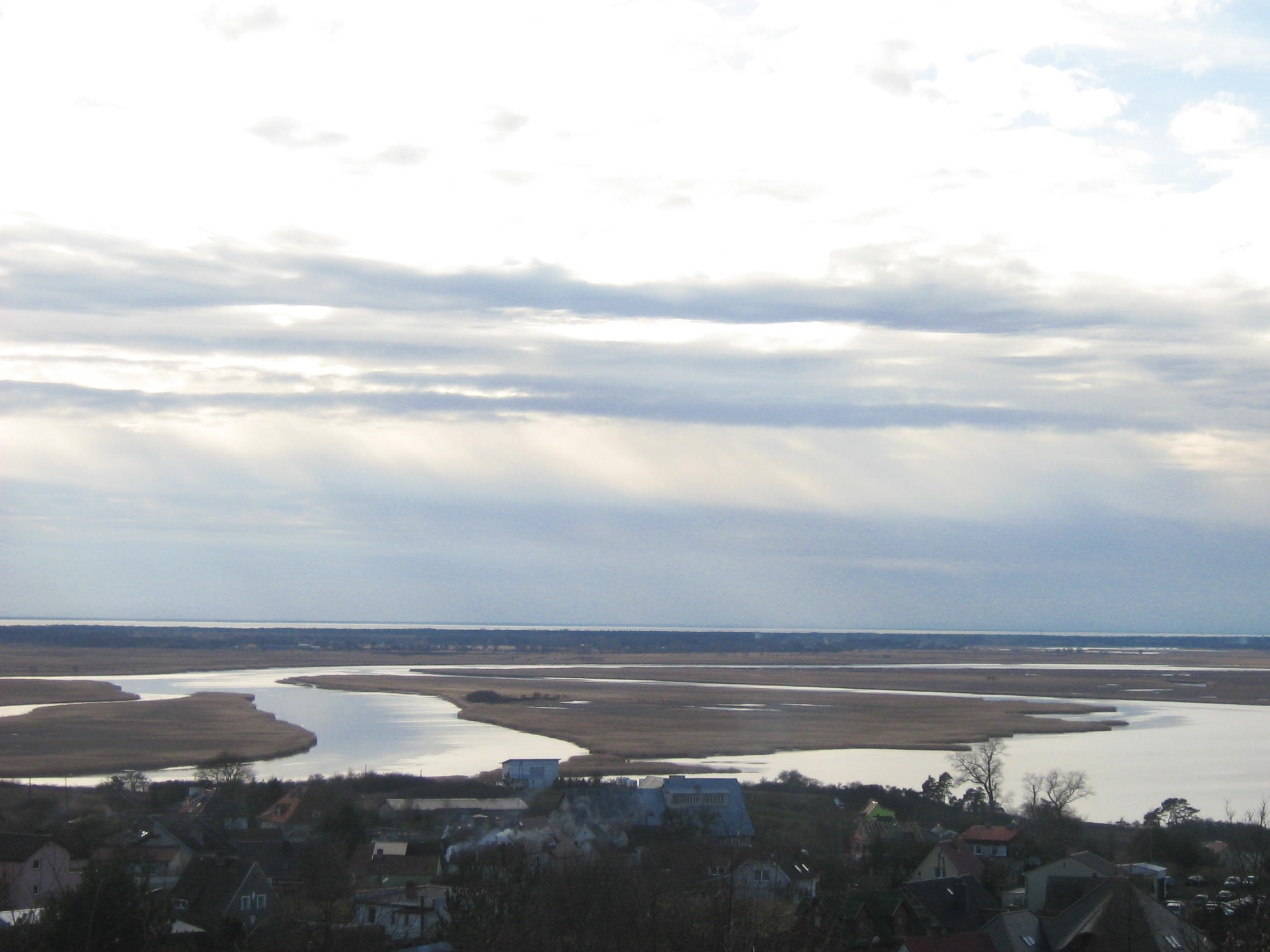
- Wielki Krzek seen from Lubin

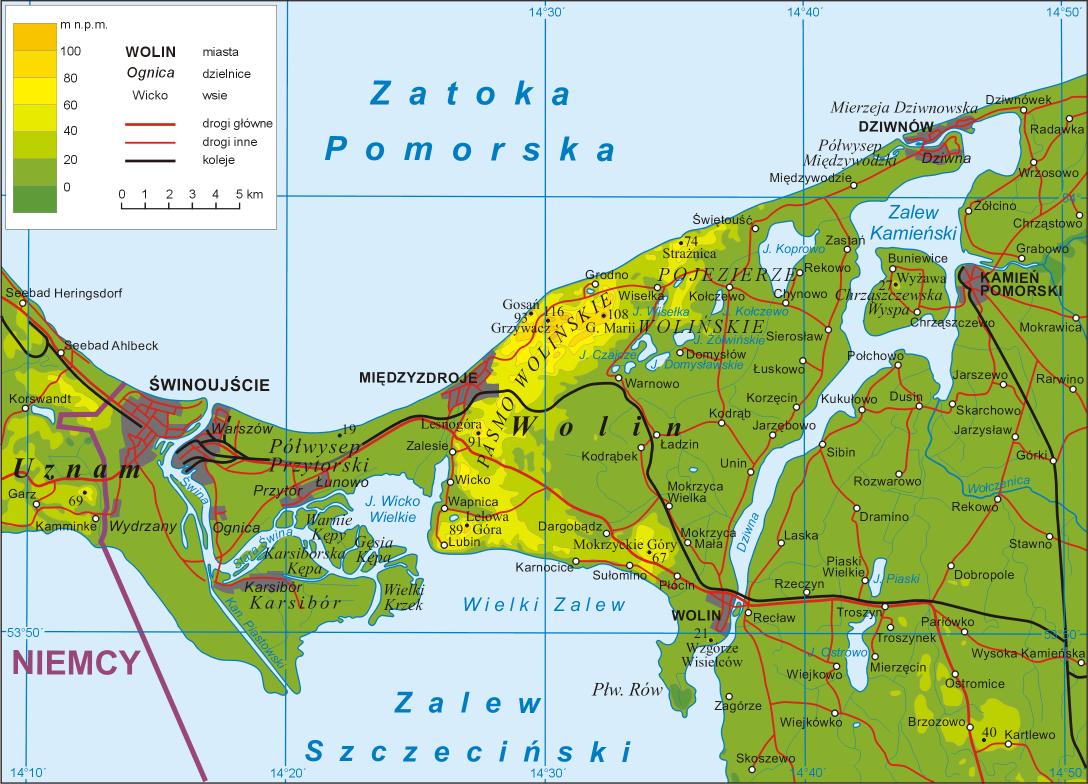
- Wielki Krzek east of Karsibór Island

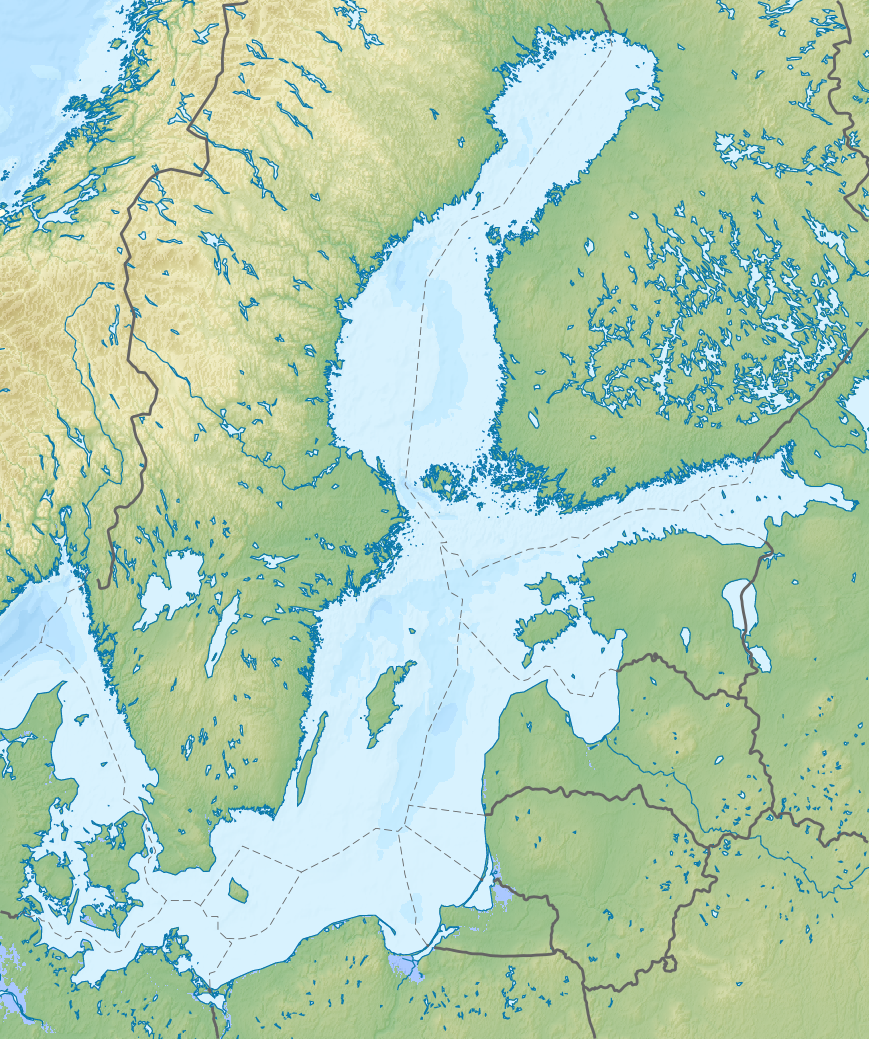
- Location within Poland Location within Baltic Sea

Geography
- Location: Szczecin Lagoon
- Coordinates: 53°51′04″N 14°24′09″E

Administration
- Poland
- Voivodeship: West Pomeranian Voivodeship
- County/City: Świnoujście

Demographics
- Population: 0

Additional information
- Time zone: CET (UTC+1)
  - Summer (DST): CEST (UTC+2)

Wielki Krzek is a Polish island in the Szczecin Lagoon, near Wolin, at the mouth of Świna, east of Karsibór. Wielki Krzek is uninhabited and is under natural protection on account of its many species of animals.
