= Ostrów Island =

Island in the Vistula River in Poland

Coordinates: 54.371°N 18.654°E

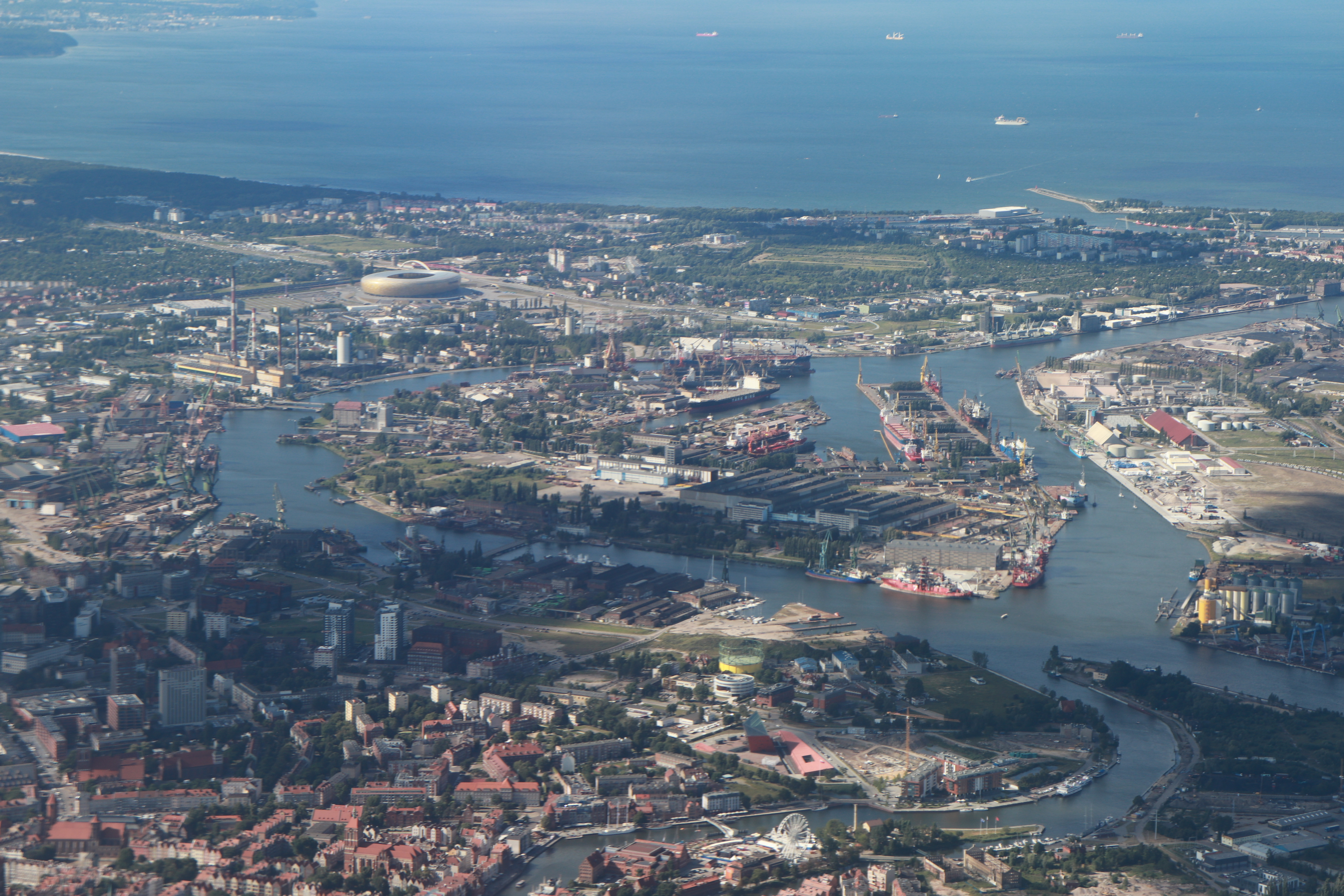
Aerial view of Ostrów Island

Ostrów Island (Polish pronunciation: [ɔstruf]) is a river island, located in the delta of the Vistula river, within the city limits of Gdańsk in northern Poland. Administratively, it is located within the district of Młyniska.

The northern border of the island is formed by the waters of Port Channel (Gdańsk), while the southern border is a rather moribund branch of the Vistula called Martwa Wisła, literally meaning dead Vistula.

Ostrow Island belongs to Gdańska Stocznia Remontowa, a prosperous industrial enterprise, and Stocznia Gdańsk, a group of Stocznia Gdynia.

During World War II, Nazi Germany operated a subcamp of the Stutthof concentration camp on the island from October 1944 to March 1945, in which they subjected around 100 Jewish women to forced labour.
