= List of islands by name (S) =

This article features a list of islands sorted by their name beginning with the letter S.

== S ==
Island's name	Island group(s)	Country/Countries
Saaremaa	West Estonian Archipelago; Baltic Sea	Estonia
Saarnaki laid	Väinameri Sea	Estonia
Saba (Saba (island))	Lesser Antilles	Netherlands
Cayo Sabinal	Greater Antilles	Cuba
Sable	Nova Scotia	Canada
Sabrina	Balleny Islands	Ross Dependency, New Zealand
Sabula	Iowa	United States
Saddle	South Orkney Islands	Claimed by: United Kingdom as part of the Falkland Islands and by Argentina
Safra	Alentejo islands	Portugal
St Agnes	Isles of Scilly	United Kingdom
Saint Anastasia	Black Sea	Bulgaria
Saint Andrews	Admiralty Islands	Papua New Guinea
St. Armands Key		United States
Saint Barthélemy	Lesser Antilles	France
Saint Catherine	Susquehanna River, Maryland	United States
Saint Catherine	Potomac River, Maryland	United States
Saint Clement's	Potomac River, Maryland	United States
Saint Croix	United States Virgin Islands, Lesser Antilles	United States
Saint Croix	Saint Croix River, Maine	United States
Saint Cyicus	Black Sea	Bulgaria
Saint Eustratius		Greece
Saint George	Potomac River, Maryland	United States
Saint Giles	Lesser Antilles	Trinidad and Tobago
Saint Ivan	Black Sea	Bulgaria
Saint Helena		(United Kingdom) British overseas territory of Saint Helena, Ascension and Tristan da Cunha
St. Helena Island (Maryland)	Maryland	United States
Saint Helena	Straits of Mackinac, Michigan	United States
Saint Helena	Sea Islands, South Carolina	United States
Saint Helena	Little Round Bay, Maryland	United States
Île Saint-Honorat	Lérins Islands	France
Saint Helen's	St. Lawrence River, Quebec	Canada
Saint John	United States Virgin Islands, Lesser Antilles	United States
Saint Johns	Missouri River, Missouri	United States
Saint Joseph	Ontario	Canada
Saint Kitts	Lesser Antilles	Saint Kitts and Nevis
Saint Lawrence	Bering Sea, Alaska	United States
Saint Lucia	Lesser Antilles	Saint Lucia
Saint Margaret	Potomac River, Maryland	United States
Île Sainte-Marguerite	Lérins Islands	France
Saint Martin	Lesser Antilles	Divided between: France and Kingdom of the Netherlands
Saint Martin	Otago Harbour	New Zealand
Saint Martin's	Isles of Scilly	United Kingdom
Saint Martin Island	Bay of Bengal	Bangladesh
St Mary's	Isles of Scilly	United Kingdom
Saint Matthew	Bering Sea, Alaska	United States
St. Maurice Towhead	Mississippi River,Louisiana	United States
Saint Paul	Nova Scotia	Canada
Saint Paul	Pribilof Islands, Alaska	United States
Île Saint-Paul	French Southern Territories, Indian Ocean	France
Saint Peter	Black Sea	Bulgaria
Saint Pierre	Manokin River, Maryland	United States
Saint Simons	Golden Isles of Georgia, Georgia	United States
Saint Thomas	United States Virgin Islands, Lesser Antilles	United States
Saint Vincent	Lesser Antilles	Saint Vincent and the Grenadines
Saint Vincent	Florida	United States
Sakhalin	North Pacific, Sakhalin Oblast	Russia
Salamina	Saronic Islands	Greece
Salawati	Raja Ampat Islands	Indonesia
Salina	Aeolian Islands	Italy
Salisbury	Nunavut	Canada
Salsette	Maharashtra	India
Saltholm	Øresund	Denmark/Sweden
Saltspring	Gulf Islands, British Columbia	Canada
Samalga	Fox Islands group of the Aleutian Islands, Alaska	United States
Samar	Visayas	Philippines
Samhah	Socotra	Yemen
Samos Island	Beira Litoral Islands	Portugal
Samos	Dodecanese	Greece
Samothrace		Greece
Samphrey	Shetland Islands	Scotland
Sampson	Pleasant Bay, Cape Cod, Massachusetts	United States
Samsø	Kattegat	Denmark
Samson	Isles of Scilly	United Kingdom
San Andrés	San Andrés y Providencia	Colombia
San Benedicto	Revillagigedo Islands, Colima	Mexico
San Benitos		Mexico
San Clemente Island	Channel Islands of California, California	United States
San Cristobal	Solomon Islands	Solomon Islands
San José	Baja California Sur	Mexico
San Jose	Texas	United States
San Juan	San Juan Islands, Washington	United States
San Martiño	Galicia	Spain
San Miguel	Channel Islands of California, California	United States
San Nicolas	Channel Islands of California, California	United States
San Pietro	Sardinia	Italy
San Salvador	The Bahamas	Bahamas
Sanak	Sanak Islands, Gulf of Alaska, Alaska	United States
Sand Cay	Spratly Islands	Disputed between: China, Republic of China, Vietnam, Brunei, Philippines, and Malaysia
Sand	Ohio River, Kentucky	United States
Sand	Hawaii	United States
Sanday	The North Isles, Orkney Islands	Scotland
Sandoy	Faroe Islands	Denmark
Sandwip	Bay of Bengal	Bangladesh
Sandy	Georgian Bay, Ontario	Canada
Sandy	Nanticoke River, Maryland	United States
Sandy Point	Newfoundland and Labrador	Canada
Sandy Point	Sinepuxent Bay, Maryland	United States
Sannak	Fox Islands group of the Aleutian Islands, Alaska	United States
Sans Souci	Georgian Bay Ontario	Canada
Santa Ana	Solomon Islands	Solomon Islands
Santa Barbara	Channel Islands of California, California	United States
Santa Catalina	Channel Islands of California, California	United States
Santa Clara	Juan Fernández archipelago, Chile	Chile
Santa Cruz	Channel Islands of California, California	United States
Santa Isabel	Solomon Islands	Solomon Islands
Santa Margarita	Baja California Sur	Mexico
Santa Maria	Azores	Portugal
Santa Rosa	Channel Islands of California, California	United States
Santa Rosa	Florida	United States
Santorini	Cyclades	Greece
São Brás	Alentejo islands	Portugal
São Jorge	Azores	Portugal
São Miguel	Azores	Portugal
São Tomé	Gulf of Guinea	São Tomé and Príncipe
Saona Island	Antilles	Dominican Republic
Sardinia		Italy
Saria		Greece
Sark	Channel Islands	Guernsey
Saturna	Gulf Islands, British Columbia	Canada
Saunders	Falkland Islands	United Kingdom
Sauvie	Columbia River, Oregon	United States
Savage	Near Islands group of the Aleutian Islands, Alaska	United States
Savai'i	Samoan Islands	Samoa
Savary	Georgia Straight, British Columbia	Canada
Sawyer	Mississippi River,Minnesota	United States
Sazan	Bay of Vlorë	Albania
Scarecrow	Michigan	United States
Scharhörn	North Sea	Germany
Schiermonnikoog	West Frisian Islands	Netherlands
Schmidt	Severnaya Zemlya, Krasnoyarsk Krai	Russia
Schoinoussa	Cyclades	Greece
School	Platte River, Nebraska	United States
Schouwen-Duiveland	Zeeland	Netherlands
Scilly	Windward Islands, Society Islands, French Polynesia	Overseas Lands of France
Scott		Ross Dependency, New Zealand
Scott	Potomac River, Maryland	United States
Scotts	Kanawha River, West Virginia	United States
Scout	Tygart Valley River, West Virginia	United States
Sea	Fraser River, British Columbia	Canada
Seal	South Shetland Islands	Claimed by: Argentine Antarctica, Argentina, Antártica Chilena Province of Chile, and British Antarctic Territory of theUnited Kingdom
Sealion	Falkland Islands	United Kingdom
Sebatik	Sabah	Indonesia and Malaysia
Secretary		New Zealand
Sedanka	Fox Islands group of the Aleutian Islands, Alaska	United States
Seguam	Andreanof Islands group of the Aleutian Islands, Alaska	United States
Segula	Rat Islands group of the Aleutian Islands, Alaska	United States
Seil	Slate Islands of the Inner Hebrides	Scotland
Seiland	Finnmark	Norway
Île de Sein	Atlantic Ocean	France
Sejerø	Kattegat	Denmark
Selaön	Lake Mälaren	Sweden
Selden	Potomac River, Maryland	United States
Selvagem Grande	Savage Islands group of the Madeira Islands	Portugal
Selvagem Pequena	Savage Islands group of the Madeira Islands	Portugal
Semisopochnoi	Rat Islands group of the Aleutian Islands, Alaska	United States
Semyonovsky	New Siberian Islands	Russia
Senja	Troms	Norway
Serifos	Cyclades	Greece
Seven	Cheat River, West Virginia	United States
Seven Mile	Jersey Shore, New Jersey	United States
Severny	Novaya Zemlya, Arkhangelsk Oblast	Russia
Shackleford	North Carolina	United States
Shandrew	Mississippi River, Illinois	United States
Shapinsay	The North Isles, Orkney Islands	Scotland
Sharp	Georgian Bay, Ontario	Canada
Sharp		Hong Kong
Sharpes	Chesapeake Bay, Maryland	United States
Swan	Chesapeake Bay, Maryland	United States
Sharpshin	Potomac River, Maryland	United States
Shatvar	Persian Gulf	Iran
Shaw	San Juan Islands, Washington	United States
Shawanaga	Georgian Bay, Ontario	Canada
Sheek's	St. Lawrence Seaway, Ontario	Canada
Snead		United States
Shell		Wales
Shell	Florida	United States
Shell	Louisiana	United States
Shelldrake	Brockanorton Bay, Maryland	United States
Shemya	Semichi Islands cluster in the Near Islands group of the Aleutian Islands, Alaska	United States
Shenick		Ireland
Shepherds	Potomac River, Maryland	United States
Sherbo	Atlantic Ocean	Sierra Leone
Sherkin	Islands of Roaringwater Bay, County Cork	Ireland
Sherose	Nova Scotia	Canada
Sherwin	Potomac River, Maryland	United States
Shiashkotan	Kuril Islands, Sakhalin Oblast	Russia
Shif	Persian Gulf	Iran
Shikinejima	Izu Islands	Japan
Shikoku	Japanese archipelago	Japan
Shikotan	Kuril Islands, Sakhalin Oblast	Russia, claimed by Japan
Shimoji	Miyako Islands part of the Sakishima Islands part of the Ryukyu Islands	Japan
Ship	Gulf Coast, Mississippi	United States
Ship	Newfoundland and Labrador	Canada
Shippingport	Ohio River, Kentucky	United States
Shoe	Beaver Island archipelago, Lake Michigan, Michigan	United States
Shomali	Persian Gulf	Iran
Shooters	Newark Bay, New Jersey	United States
Shortland	Shortland Islands	Solomon Islands
Shreves Bar	Mississippi River,Louisiana Mississippi	United States
Shumshu	Kuril Islands, Sakhalin Oblast	Russia
Shuna	Slate Islands	Scotland
Shuwaikh	Kuwait Bay	Kuwait
Sicily		Italy
Sido		South Korea
Sifnos	Cyclades	Greece
Signy	South Orkney Islands	Claimed by theUnited Kingdom as part of the Falkland Islands and by Argentina
Sijiao Island	Zhoushan Archipelago	China
Sikaiana	Solomon Islands	Solomon Islands
Sikinos	Cyclades	Greece
Silba	Adriatic Sea	Croatia
Silmido	Yellow Sea	South Korea
Simushir	Kuril Islands, Sakhalin Oblast	Russia
Sinclair	Great Barrier Reef, Queensland	Australia
Sinclair's Island		Namibia
Sin Cowe	Spratly Islands	Disputed between: China, Republic of China, Vietnam, Brunei, Philippines, and Malaysia
Sin Cowe East	Spratly Islands	Disputed between: China, Republic of China, Vietnam, Brunei, Philippines, and Malaysia
Sindo	Yellow Sea	South Korea
Singapore		Singapore
Sinjido		South Korea
Sint Eustatius	Lesser Antilles	Netherlands
Siø	Islands of the waters south of Funen	Denmark
Šipan	Elaphiti Islands	Croatia
Sipson	Pleasant Bay, Cape Cod, Massachusetts	United States
Sipson Meadow	Pleasant Bay, Cape Cod, Massachusetts	United States
Siquijor	Visayas	Philippines
Sir Bani Yas	Persian Gulf	United Arab Emirates
Sirri	Persian Gulf	Iran
Sitrah	Persian Gulf	Bahrain
Siu A Chau	Soko Islands, Hong Kong	China
Sixmile	Allegheny River Pennsylvania	United States
Sixmile	Ohio River, Kentucky	United States
Sjaelland		Denmark
Sjumansholmen	Southern Gothenburg Archipelago	Sweden
Skantzoura	Sporades	Greece
Skarø	Islands of the waters south of Funen	Denmark
Skellig Michael	Skellig Islands	Ireland
Skiathos	Sporades	Greece
Skogerøy		Norway
Skopelos	Sporades	Greece
Skraeling	Nunavut	Canada
Skull	British Columbia	Canada
Skúvoy	Faroe Islands	Denmark
Isle of Skye	Inner Hebrides	Scotland
Skyros	Sporades	Greece
Slate	Slate Islands, Lake Superior, Ontario	Canada
Slim	Mississippi River, Missouri	United States
Slim	Ohio River, Kentucky	United States
Slipper		New Zealand
Slotsholmen	Copenhagen Harbour	Denmark
Smaller Bent	Persian Gulf	Iran
Smaojlovich	Sedov Archipelago of Severnaya Zemlya, Krasnoyarsk Krai	Russia
Smith	Chesapeake Bay, Maryland	United States
Smith	San Juan Islands, Washington	United States
Smith	South Shetland Islands	Claimed by: Argentine Antarctica, Argentina, Antártica Chilena Province of Chile, and British Antarctic Territory of theUnited Kingdom
Smith	Kankakee River, Illinois	United States
Smokehouse	Lake Huron, Ontario	Canada
Smøla		Norway
Smooth	Georgian Bay, Ontario	Canada
Snake	Black Sea	Ukraine
Snake	Lake Simcoe, Ontario	Canada
Snake	Saint Lawrence River, Ontario	Canada
Snake	Fishing Bay, Maryland	United States
Snake	Patuxent River, Maryland	United States
Snake	Potomac River, Maryland	United States
Snake	Susquehanna River, Maryland	United States
Snake	Georgian Bay, Ontario	Canada
Snape	Belcher Islands group in Hudson Bay, Nunavut	Canada
Snow	South Shetland Islands	Claimed by: Argentine Antarctica, Argentina, Antártica Chilena Province of Chile, and British Antarctic Territory of theUnited Kingdom
Soay	Inner Hebrides	Scotland
Soay	St. Kilda group of the Outer Hebrides	Scotland
Sobieszewo	Islands of Gdańsk	Poland
Sodo	Port Hamilton	South Korea
Solomons	Patuxent River, Maryland	United States
Solomons Lump	Kedges Straits, Maryland	United States
Socorro	Revillagigedo Islands, Colima	Mexico
Socotra	Socotra	Yemen
Solovetsky	Solovetsky Islands	Russia
Šolta	Adriatic Sea	Croatia
Somerset	Bermuda	United Kingdom
Somerset	Nunavut	Canada
Sondre Kvaløy		Norway
Sonora	British Columbia	Canada
Sørøya	Finnmark	Norway
Sotra	Hordaland	Norway
Sound Gruney	Shetland Islands	Scotland
South	Jason Islands of the Falkland Islands	United Kingdom
South		New Zealand
South Bass	Bass Islands, Ohio	United States
South Beach	Cape Cod, Massachusetts	United States
South Brother	Andaman Archipelago, Indian Ocean	India
South Brother	East River, New York	United States
South Brother	Chagos Archipelago, Indian Ocean	United Kingdom
South Brother	Atlantic Ocean, Connecticut	United States
South Brother	Seven Brothers, Bab-el-Mandeb	Djibouti
South Hammocks	Assawoman Bay, Maryland	United States
South Havre	Shetland Islands	Scotland
South Isle of Gletness	Shetland Islands	Scotland
South Limestone	Georgian Bay Ontario	Canada
South Long		
South Manitou	Lake Michigan, Michigan	United States
South Marsh	Chesapeake Bay, Maryland	United States
South Monomoy	Cape Cod, Massachusetts	United States
South Padre	Texas	United States
South Ronaldsay	The South Isles, Orkney Islands	Scotland
South Uist	Outer Hebrides	Scotland
South Watcher	Georgian Bay, Ontario	Canada
Southampton	Nunavut	Canada
Southwest Cay	Spratly Islands	Disputed between: China, Republic of China, Vietnam, Brunei, Philippines, and Malaysia
Spectacle	Boston Harbor, Massachusetts	United States
Speedwell	Falkland Islands	United Kingdom
Spencer	Susquehanna River, Maryland	United States
Spencer	Susquehanna River, Maryland	United States
Spencer's	Nova Scotia	Canada
Sponge Bar	Willamette River, Oregon	United States
Spriggs	Blackwater River, Maryland	United States
Spring	Holland Straits, Maryland	United States
Spesutie	Chesapeake Bay, Maryland	United States
Spetses	Saronic Islands	Greece
Spieden	San Juan Islands, Washington	United States
Spiekeroog	East Frisian Islands	Germany
Spirit	Maligne Lake, Alberta	Canada
Spitsbergen	Svalbard	Norway
Sport-sziget	Danube River	Hungary
Split	Belcher Islands, Hudson Bay, Nunavut	Canada
Spratly	Spratly Islands	Disputed between: China, Republic of China, Vietnam, Brunei, Philippines, and Malaysia
Sprogø	Great Belt	Denmark
Spry	Chesapeake Bay, Maryland	United States
Square	Newfoundland and Labrador	Canada
Srednij	Sedov Archipelago of Severnaya Zemlya, Krasnoyarsk Krai	Russia
Sri Lanka		Sri Lanka
Ssese	Lake Victoria	Uganda
Staats	Falkland Islands	United Kingdom
Stack	Mississippi River,Mississippi	United States
Stag	St. Clair River, Ontario	Canada
Stags of Broadhaven		Ireland
Stall Hill	Lake Rico, Massachusetts	United States
Stansbury	Great Salt Lake, Utah	United States
Star	Isles of Shoals, New Hampshire	United States
Starbuck	Line Islands	Kiribati
Starbuck	Hudson River, New York	United States
Starve	Lake Erie, Ohio	United States
Staten	New York	United States
Stefansson	Nunavut	Canada
Stephens	Marlborough Sounds	New Zealand
Stevens	Lake Huron, Ontario	Canada
Stevens	Massachusetts	United States
Stewart		New Zealand
Stewart	Ohio River, Kentucky	United States
Steels	Susquehanna River, Maryland	United States
Steeple	Jason Islands of the Falkland Islands	United Kingdom
Sterrett	Susquehanna River, Maryland	United States
Steves	Chincoteague Bay, Maryland	United States
Stingaree	Blackwater River, Maryland	United States
Stjernøya	Finnmark	Norway
Stolobny	Lake Seliger, Tver Oblast	Russia
Stolbovoy	New Siberian Islands	Russia
Stoltenhoff	Nightingale Islands, Tristan da Cunha	(United Kingdom) British Overseas Territory of Saint Helena
Stóra Dímun	Faroe Islands	Denmark
Stora Förö	Southern Gothenburg Archipelago	Sweden
Stor	Nunavut	Canada
Stora Karlsö	Baltic Sea	Sweden
Stord	Sunnhordland, Vestland	Norway
Streymoy	Faroe Islands	Denmark
Stromboli	Aeolian Islands	Italy
Strong	Pleasant Bay, Cape Cod, Massachusetts	United States
Stronsay	The North Isles, Orkney Islands	Scotland
Strynø		Denmark
Stuart	Discovery Islands, British Columbia	Canada
Stuart	San Juan Islands, Washington	United States
Stucker	Susquehanna River, Pennsylvania	United States
Sturge	Balleny Islands	Ross Dependency, New Zealand
Styrsö	Southern Gothenburg Archipelago	Sweden
Suakin Archipelago		Sudan
Sucia	San Juan Islands, Washington	United States
Süderoog	North Frisian Islands	Germany
Südfall	North Frisian Islands	Germany
Sue	Middle River, Maryland	United States
Sugar	Illinois River, Illinois	United States
Sugar	Michigan	United States
Sula	Møre og Romsdal	Norway
Sula Sgeir	British Isles	Scotland
Sulawesi		Indonesia
Sumatra		Indonesia
Sunhodo	Port Hamilton	South Korea
Suomenlinna	Gulf of Finland	Finland
Suðuroy	Faroe Islands	Denmark
Surtsey	Vestmannaeyjar	Iceland
Susak	Adriatic Sea	Croatia
Sutwik	Alaska	United States
Suur-Pakri	Pakri Islands	Estonia
Suvorov	Cook Islands	Cook Islands
Suwad Al Janubiyah	Hawar Islands	Bahrain
Suwad Al Shamaliyah	Hawar Islands	Bahrain
Suwanosejima	Tokara Islands part of the Satsunan Islands part of the Ryukyu Islands	Japan
Suwarrow	Cook Islands	Cook Islands
Svartsjölandet	Lake Mälaren	Sweden
Sveaborg	Gulf of Finland	Finland
Sveta Neđelja	Adriatic Sea	Montenegro
Sveti Andrija	Elaphiti Islands	Croatia
Sveti Đorđe	Bay of Kotor Islands	Montenegro
Sveti Grgur	Adriatic Sea	Croatia
Sveti Marko	Bay of Kotor Islands	Montenegro
Sveti Nikola	Adriatic Sea	Montenegro
Sveti Stefan	Adriatic Sea	Montenegro
Svínoy	Faroe Islands	Denmark
Swains	Tokelau chain, American Samoa	United States
Swainson	Potomac River, Maryland	United States
Swan	Blackwater River, Maryland	United States
Swan	Chesapeake Bay, Maryland	United States
Swan		Honduras
Swan's	Maine	United States
Sweyn Holm	The North Isles, Orkney Islands	Scotland
Swindle	British Columbia	Canada
Switha	The South Isles, Orkney Islands	Scotland
Swona	The South Isles, Orkney Islands	Scotland
Sycamore	Potomac River, Maryland	United States
Sycamore	Allegheny River, Pennsylvania	United States
Sylt	North Frisian Islands	Germany
Symi	Dodecanese	Greece
Syrna	Dodecanese	Greece
Syros	Cyclades	Greece
Szalki-sziget	Danube	Hungary
Szentendrei-sziget	Danube	Hungary
Szúnyog-sziget	Danube	Hungary

== See also ==
- List of islands (by country)
- List of islands by area
- List of islands by population
- List of islands by highest point
