= Savage Island =

Savage Island or Savage Islands may refer to:

== Islands ==
- Niue (formerly "Savage Island"), an island nation in the South Pacific Ocean
- Savage Island (Alaska)
- Savage Islands, a small Portuguese archipelago in the North Atlantic Ocean off the Canary Islands
- Savage Island (Washington)

== Entertainment ==
- Savage Island (film), a 1985 film starring Linda Blair
- Savage Islands (film), a 1983 adventure film starring Tommy Lee Jones
- Savage Island (album), a 2008 album released by rapper Savage

== See also ==
- Lower Savage Islands, Nunavut, Canada
- Middle Savage Islands, Nunavut, Canada
