= Saint Helena Island =

Saint Helena Island may refer to:

- Saint Helena, in the South Atlantic Ocean
- St. Helena Island, Maryland
- St. Helena Island (Michigan)
- Saint Helena Island (South Carolina)
- St Helena Island, Queensland, Australia
