= Cape Dory 25 =

Sailboat class

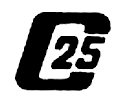

Development
- Designer: George H. Stadel Jr.
- Location: United States
- Year: 1973
- No. built: 845
- Builder: Cape Dory Yachts
- Role: Cruiser
- Name: Cape Dory 25

Boat
- Displacement: 4,000 lb (1,814 kg)
- Draft: 3.00 ft (0.91 m)

Hull
- Type: monohull
- Construction: fiberglass
- LOA: 24.83 ft (7.57 m)
- LWL: 18.00 ft (5.49 m)
- Beam: 7.25 ft (2.21 m)
- Engine: outboard motor

Hull appendages
- Keel: long keel
- Ballast: 1,700 lb (771 kg)
- Rudder: keel-mounted rudder

Rig
- Rig type: Bermuda rig
- I foretriangle height: 27.58 ft (8.41 m)
- J foretriangle base: 9.00 ft (2.74 m)
- P mainsail luff: 24.00 ft (7.32 m)
- E mainsail foot: 11.50 ft (3.51 m)

Sails
- Sailplan: masthead sloop
- Mainsail area: 138.00 sq ft (12.821 m^{2})
- Jib/genoa area: 124.11 sq ft (11.530 m^{2})
- Total sail area: 262.11 sq ft (24.351 m^{2})

Racing
- PHRF: 255

The Cape Dory 25, is a recreational keelboat built by Cape Dory Yachts. 845 boats were built between 1973 and 1982.

It was also called the Cape Dory 25 Mark I, and is sometimes confused with the unrelated 1981 design from the same manufacturer which replaced it in production, the Cape Dory 25D.

== Design ==
Designed by George H. Stadel Jr., it is a development of the Allied Boat Company's Greenwich 24, using the same hull, but a new deck and coach house. Allied sold the molds to Cape Dory in 1972. Cape Dory increased the freeboard to improve below decks headroom and this also added 7 in (18 cm) to both the length overall and the waterline length. They also redesigned the interior.

The fiberglass hull has a spooned, raked stem, a raised counter, angled transom; a keel-mounted rudder controlled by a tiller and a fixed long keel. It displaces 4,000 lb (1,814 kg) and carries 1,700 lb (771 kg) of ballast.

The boat has a draft of 3.00 ft (0.91 m) with the standard keel.

It has a masthead sloop rig with a deck-stepped mast.

The boat is normally fitted with a small 4 to 8 hp (3 to 6 kW) outboard motor for docking and maneuvering.

The design has sleeping accommodation for four people, with a double "V"-berth in the bow cabin and two straight settees in the main cabin. The main cabin also has drop leaf table. The galley is located on the starboard side just forward of the companionway ladder. The galley is equipped with a two-burner stove and a sink. The head is located just aft of the bow cabin on the port side. Cabin headroom is 60 in (150 cm). There is a lazarette in the stern.

The design has a PHRF racing average handicap of 255 and a hull speed of 5.7 kn (10.6 km/h).

In a 2000 review in Practical Sailor, Darrell Nicholson wrote, "the Cape Dory 25 is really a daysailing and weekending boat. Although the boat has berths for 4, accommodations are cramped and creature comforts minimal."

In a 2010 review Steve Henkel wrote of the design, "best features: These changes [from the Greenwich 24] got rid of some of the "Worst features" [of] the Greenwich 24 ... and if the manufacturer's specifications are to be believed, after all these additions were made, the boat's weight increased by a mere 25 pounds, with no change in ballast. Can you believe it? We don’t. Worst features: Headroom is still too low, but this fault is corrected in the next incarnation, namely the [Cape Dory 25D]."

A Blue Water Boats review noted, "the Cape Dory 25 was Cape Dory's first foray into fully fledged cruisers. The story goes that founder Andy Vavolotis got a hold of the molds for the Greenwich 24 from Allied Boat Company in 1972 and raised her freeboard to improve headroom, thereby adding seven inches to her length. Other alterations included a fully enclosed head, a hanging locker, and an enlarged galley. She's a sloop rigged full keeler with a narrow low-freeboard hull that invites a wet ride. The design is quite dated but traditionalist[s] will love the classic lines and underwater profile, and of course true to Cape Dory tradition, the construction is bulletproof."

== Operational history ==
The boat is supported by an active class club that organizes racing events, the Cape Dory Sailboat Owners Association.
