= Cape Dory 25D =

Sailboat class

Development
- Designer: Carl Alberg
- Location: United States
- Year: 1981
- No. built: 189
- Builders: Cape Dory Yachts; C. W. Hood Yachts
- Role: Cruiser
- Name: Cape Dory 25D

Boat
- Displacement: 5,120 lb (2,322 kg)
- Draft: 3.50 ft (1.07 m)

Hull
- Type: monohull
- Construction: fiberglass
- LOA: 25.00 ft (7.62 m)
- LWL: 19.00 ft (5.79 m)
- Beam: 8.00 ft (2.44 m)
- Engine: Yanmar 1GM 8 hp (6 kW) diesel engine

Hull appendages
- Keel: long keel
- Ballast: 2,050 lb (930 kg)
- Rudder: keel-mounted rudder

Rig
- Rig type: Bermuda rig
- I foretriangle height: 32.00 ft (9.75 m)
- J foretriangle base: 10.25 ft (3.12 m)
- P mainsail luff: 27.25 ft (8.31 m)
- E mainsail foot: 10.25 ft (3.12 m)

Sails
- Sailplan: masthead sloop
- Mainsail area: 139.66 sq ft (12.975 m^{2})
- Jib/genoa area: 164.00 sq ft (15.236 m^{2})
- Total sail area: 303.66 sq ft (28.211 m^{2})

Racing
- PHRF: 255

The Cape Dory 25D, also called the Cape Dory 25 Mark II and later sold as the Octavia 25, is an American trailerable sailboat that was designed by Carl Alberg as a cruiser and first built in 1981. The "D" designation indicates that it is equipped with a diesel engine.

The Cape Dory 25D is sometimes confused with the unrelated 1973 design from the same manufacturer, which it replaced in production, the Cape Dory 25.

== Production ==
The design was built by Cape Dory Yachts in East Taunton, Massachusetts, United States from 1981 to 1985, with 189 boats completed. The design was also built around 1996 by C. W. Hood Yachts and sold as the Octavia 25, but it is now out of production.

== Design ==
The Cape Dory 25D was intended to be a replacement boat for the Cape Dory 25 after sales of that model dropped off. The design goals included a boat with more sail power, capable of being cruised on extended voyages in comfort by two people.

The Cape Dory 25D is a recreational keelboat, built predominantly of fiberglass, with teak wood trim. The deck and cabin roof have a balsa core. It has a masthead sloop rig with a deck stepped mast; a spooned, raked stem; a raised counter, angled transom; a keel-mounted rudder controlled by a tiller and a fixed long keel. It displaces 5,120 lb (2,322 kg) and carries 2,050 lb (930 kg) of ballast.

The boat has a draft of 3.50 ft (1.07 m) with the standard keel.

The boat is fitted with a Japanese Yanmar 2GMF 1GM diesel engine of 8 hp (6 kW) for docking and maneuvering. The fuel tank holds 13 U.S. gallons (49 L; 11 imp gal) and the fresh water tank has a capacity of 20 U.S. gallons (76 L; 17 imp gal).

The design has sleeping accommodation for four people, with two straight settees in the main cabin, one of which can convert into a double and a quarter berth aft on the starboard side. The L-shaped galley is located on the port side just forward of the companionway ladder. The galley is equipped with a two-burner stove and a sink. The head is located in the bow and includes a vanity, wet and dry hanging lockers and a shower that drains into the bilge. The interior has a fully-molded hull liner. Cabin headroom is 71 in (180 cm).

The design has a PHRF racing average handicap of 255 and a hull speed of 5.8 kn (10.7 km/h).

== Operational history ==
The boat is supported by an active class club that organizes racing events, the Cape Dory Sailboat Owners Association.

In a 2010 review Steve Henkel wrote, "best features: In our opinion this boat might come close to the ideal boat for couples who want a cruising boat that can go offshore and has some elbow below, but still can be trailered hither and yon behind a big pickup truck. Worst features: The Cape Dory 25D wins the prize for the highest PHRF among her comp[etitor]s, though sailors who find this boat appealing probably won't do much racing anyway. For steering comfort, the tiller sprouting out of the cockpit sole is not the best."

In a 2000 review in Practical Sailor, Darrell Nicholson wrote, "the only thing that the 25 and the 25D have in common is overall length. The 25D was an entirely different boat: wider, heavier, deeper, with inboard engine, a dramatically different interior, and a new price tag 50% higher than that of the 25 ... The 25D has the potential to be a comfortable long-term cruiser for a couple, with a roomy interior whose only real flaw is a mediocre galley arrangement ... The 25D is tough enough to be a serious cruising boat, We would not be surprised to hear that someone sails one across the Atlantic, although ocean voyaging in so small a boat is not our personal cup of tea."

== See also ==
- List of sailing boat types

Related development

- Cape Dory 25
