= Miracle of Jindo =

Tidal phenomenon in South Korea

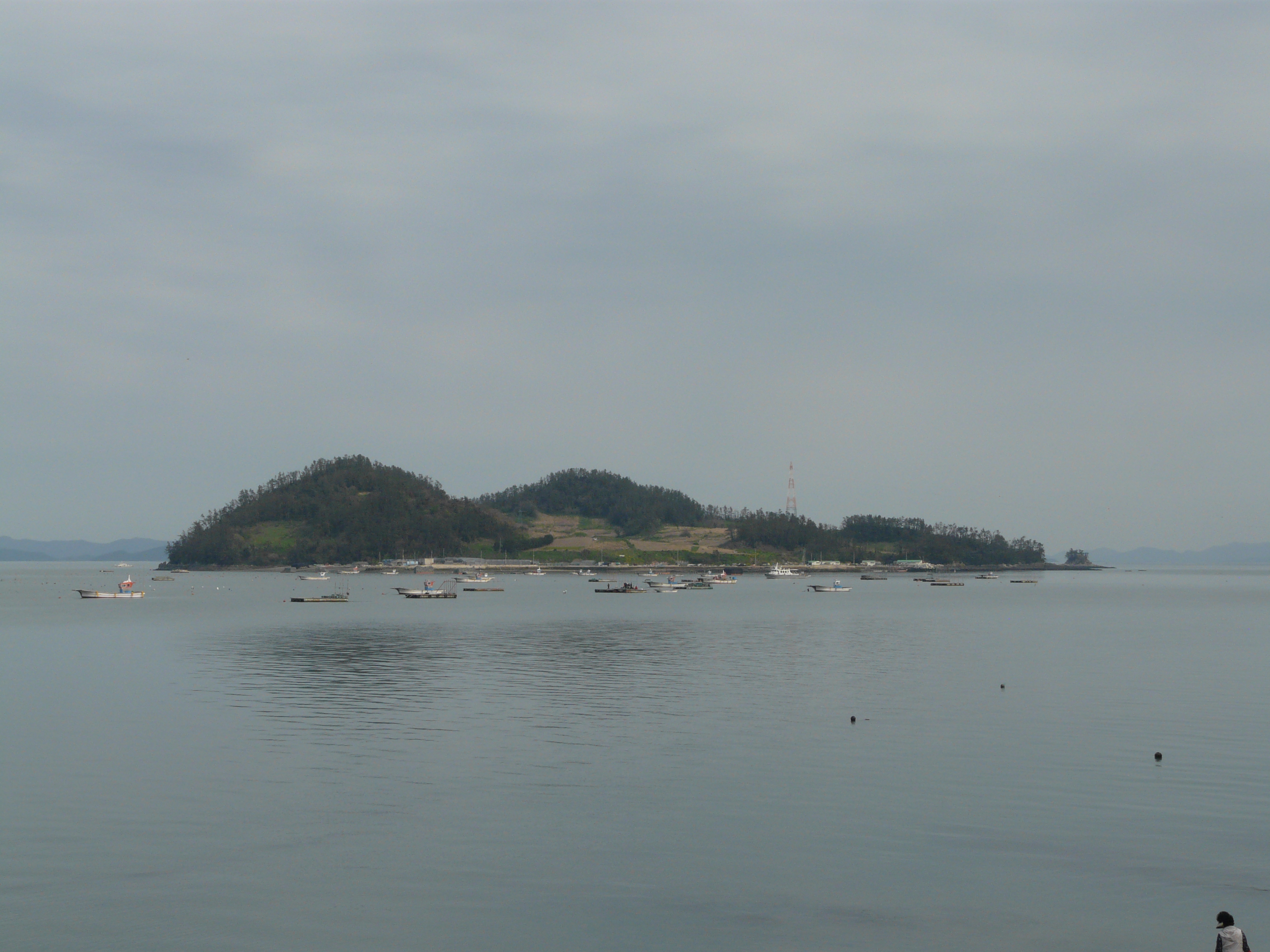
The Jindo sea road in which the tidal phenomemon takes place every year

Miracle of Jindo, also known as the Jindo Sea Parting or Jindo Sea Road, is a natural tidal phenomenon occurring between Jindo Island and Modo Island in South Korea. During exceptionally low spring tides, a temporary land bridge approximately 2.8–2.9 km (1.7–1.8 mi) long and 40–60 m (130–200 ft) wide emerges, allowing pedestrians to cross between the two islands for about one hour.

== Tidal phenomenon ==
The phenomenon results from exceptionally low tides produced by the combined gravitational effects of the moon and the sun, together with the local coastal topography and seabed morphology. The nearby Myeongnyang Strait amplifies tidal currents, while accumulated sand and sediment between the islands become exposed during the lowest tides, forming the temporary sea road.

The sea road typically appears twice each year, most commonly between March and June, although the timing varies with the tidal cycle. The event is celebrated during the annual Jindo Miracle Sea Road Festival, which features traditional Korean music and dance, folk performances, and cultural events. Visitors also collect shellfish and other marine organisms from the exposed tidal flats.

== See also ==
- Tidal bore
- Spring tide
- Jindo Island
