= East Taunton, Massachusetts =

Coordinates: 41°53′00″N 71°01′43″W

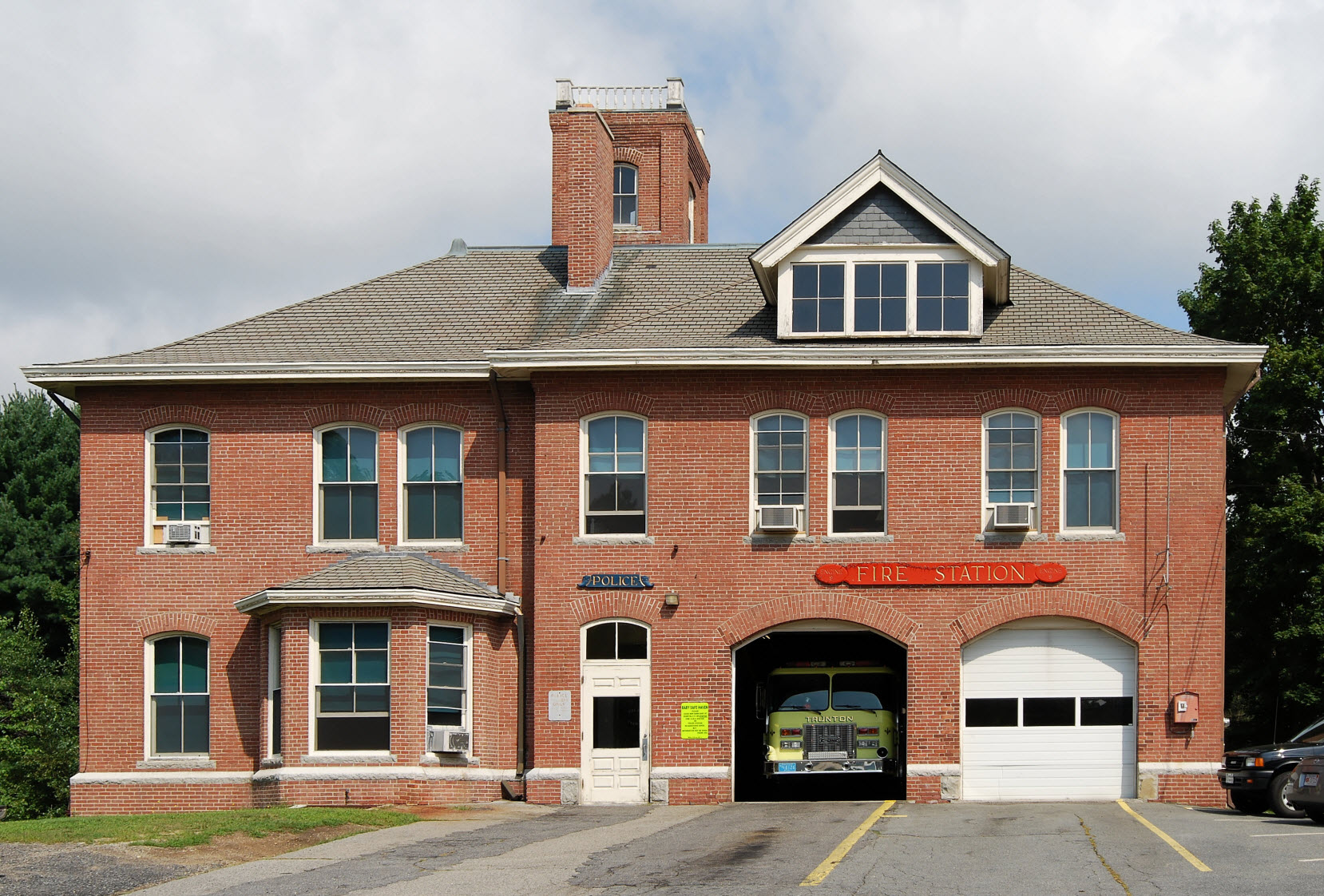
East Taunton Fire Station

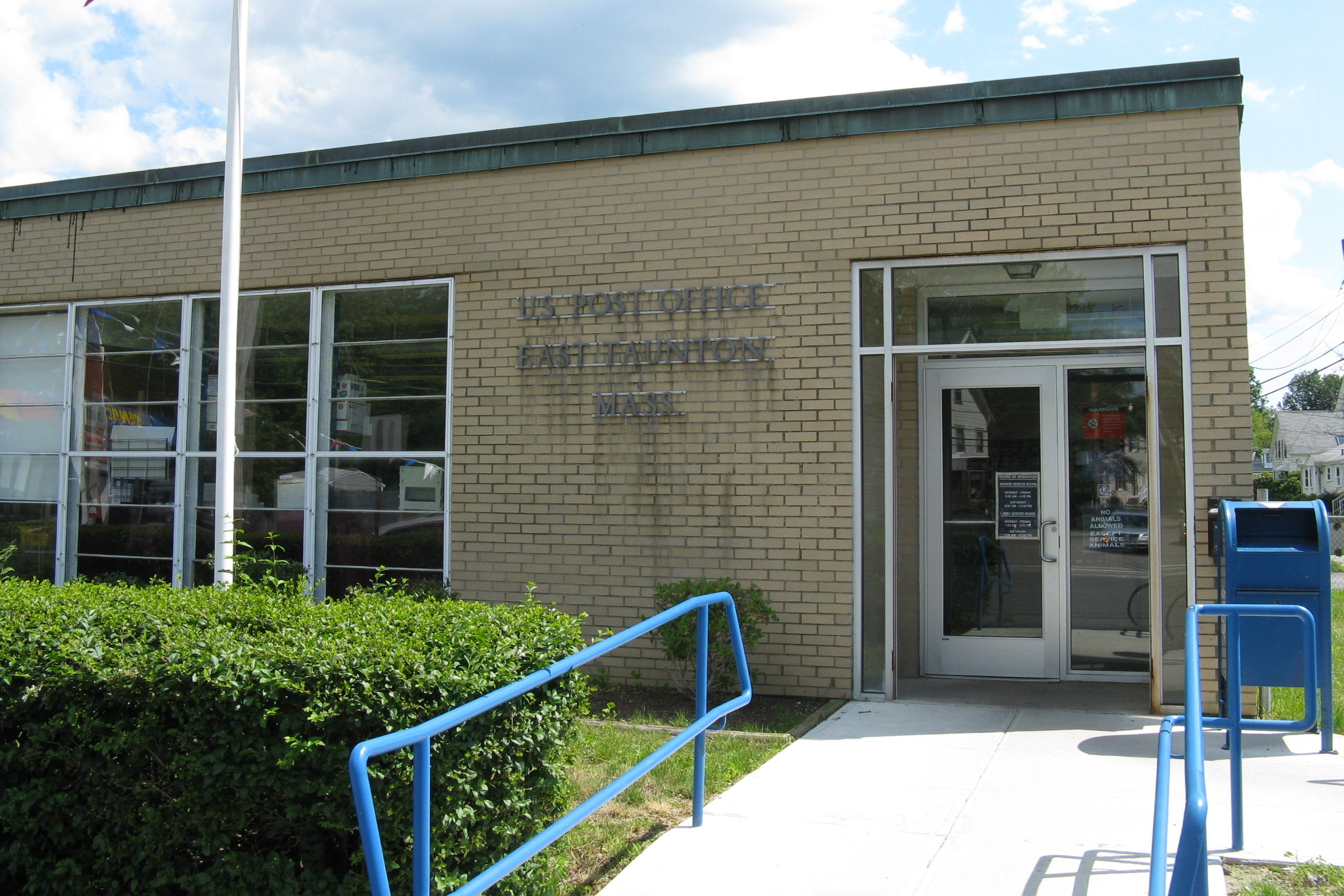
East Taunton Post Office

East Taunton is a suburban neighborhood of Taunton, Massachusetts, United States.

East Taunton is home to Massasoit State Park, which offers mountain bike trails, and kayaking and fishing on the park's four main lakes, the largest of which is Lake Rico. Other lakes in the park include Big Bear Hole Pond, Middle Pond, and Little Bear Hole Pond. It is also the location of some of the oldest active manufacturers in the US, including Norwell Manufacturing, a maker of lighting products for over 75 years. The neighborhood is served by East Taunton police precinct and the East Taunton Fire station.

East Taunton is served by Route 140; Route 79 also runs north–south through East Taunton between Berkley and Middleborough, and serves as the town line for Taunton and Lakeville. East Taunton station, served by the MBTA Commuter Rail Fall River/New Bedford Line, is located off Route 140 in East Taunton. East Taunton also used to be home to the Silver City Galleria, which was a Shopping mall that drove most shoppers to the area. The mall opened in 1992 and closed in 2020. It was demolished in 2021 and is now currently being turned into Silver City Business Park.

== See also ==
- Beer Can Museum - located in East Taunton
