= Greenwich 24 =

Sailboat class

Development
- Designer: George H. Stadel Jr.
- Location: United States
- Year: 1968
- Builder: Allied Boat Co. Inc.
- Role: Cruiser-Racer-Day sailer

Boat
- Displacement: 3,825 lb (1,735 kg)
- Draft: 3.00 ft (0.91 m)

Hull
- Type: monohull
- Construction: fiberglass
- LOA: 24.25 ft (7.39 m)
- LWL: 17.42 ft (5.31 m)
- Beam: 7.25 ft (2.21 m)
- Engine: Outboard motor

Hull appendages
- Keel: long keel
- Ballast: 1,500 lb (680 kg)
- Rudder: keel-mounted rudder

Rig
- Rig type: Bermuda rig
- I foretriangle height: 28.00 ft (8.53 m)
- J foretriangle base: 8.80 ft (2.68 m)
- P mainsail luff: 24.00 ft (7.32 m)
- E mainsail foot: 11.00 ft (3.35 m)

Sails
- Sailplan: masthead sloop
- Mainsail area: 132.00 sq ft (12.263 m^{2})
- Jib/genoa area: 123.20 sq ft (11.446 m^{2})
- Total sail area: 255.20 sq ft (23.709 m^{2})

Racing
- PHRF: 273

The Greenwich 24 is an American trailerable sailboat that was designed by George H. Stadel Jr. as a cruiser-racer and daysailer. It was first built in 1968.

The Greenwich 24 design was developed into the Cape Dory 25 in 1973, using the same hull, but a new deck and coach house. While the Greenwich 25 was not sold in large numbers, the derivative Cape Dory 25 sold 845 boats over its nine year production run.

== Production ==
The design was built by Allied Boat Co. Inc. in the United States, but it is now out of production. It was the smallest boat in the Allied product line and was not as commercially successful as its larger boats.

== Design ==
The Greenwich 24 is a recreational keelboat, built predominantly of fiberglass, with wooden trim. It has a masthead sloop rig; a spooned raked stem; a raised counter, angled transom; a keel-mounted rudder controlled by a tiller and a fixed long keel. It displaces 3,825 lb (1,735 kg) and carries 1,500 lb (680 kg) of lead ballast.

The boat has a draft of 3.00 ft (0.91 m) with the standard keel.

The boat is normally fitted with a small, well-mounted 3 to 6 hp (2 to 4 kW) outboard motor for docking and maneuvering. The fuel tank is a portable type, while the fresh water tank has a capacity of 15 U.S. gallons (57 L; 12 imp gal). The open outboard well has been noted as troublesome, as, under some sailing conditions, it can scoop up water, if not sealed by a hatch.

The design has sleeping accommodation for four people, with a double "V"-berth in the bow cabin and two straight settees in the main cabin. The galley is located beside the companionway ladder and has only a single sink, with no stove provisions. The head is located under the forward cabin "V"-berth. Cabin headroom is 55 in (140 cm).

Ventilation is provided by a large forward deck hatch, the main hatch and the aft outboard well hatch, which has an integral vent.

The design has a PHRF racing average handicap of 273. It has a hull speed of 5.6 kn (10.4 km/h).

== Operational history ==
In a 2010 review Steve Henkel wrote, "although her marketers intimated it, the boat is not all things to all sailors. Her draft is too shallow to let her be close winded, disqualifying her from being a satisfactory "racer". Her galley space is inadequate for more than a casual overnight (Where, for example, is space for a two-burner stove?) With her narrow stern and longish counter overhang, any significant weight in the cockpit would make her stern-heavy to the point that the scuppers might let water in rather than drain out, and the open motorwell could scoop water underway, slowing the boat and gradually filling the motorwell. As one owner observed, 'It did get rather exciting when the gas cans floated up and turned over as the well filled.' (If the motor were removed, a flush plug could be inserted.)"

== See also ==
- List of sailing boat types
