= Sido (island) =

Island in Incheon, South Korea

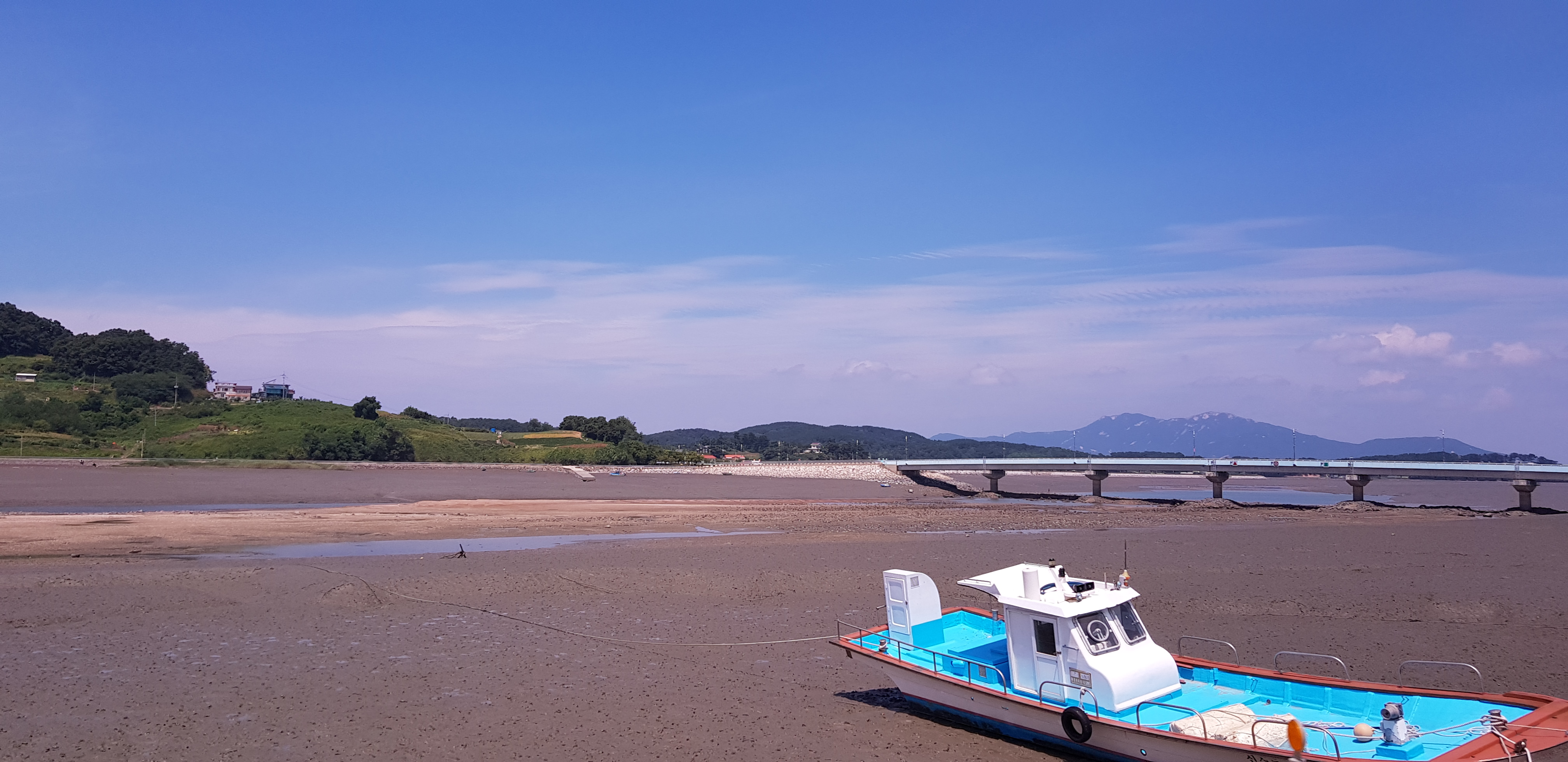
- The island (left, 2018)
- Interactive map of Sido

Geography
- Coordinates: 37°32′N 126°26′E

Korean name
- Hangul: 시도
- Hanja: 矢島
- RR: Sido
- MR: Sido

Sido (Korean: 시도; lit. arrow island), also known as Salseom, is an island in Bukdo-myeon, Ongjin County, Incheon, South Korea. It is the administrative capital of Bukdo-myeon. To its east is the island Sindo and to its west is Modo. These islands are connected via the Yeondo Bridge (연도교).

It has an area of 2.55 km^{2} (0.98 sq mi), and has a coastline length of 10.9 km (6.8 mi). The island is surrounded by tidal flats. In 2010, the island had a population of 367, 186 of whom were male and 181 female. Settlements are concentrated on the central and eastern coasts of the island. The local economy is largely based on agriculture, fishing, and foraging in the tidal flats.

The origin of the island's name, which means "arrow island", is uncertain. It perhaps comes from the late Goryeo period, during which the island was used as a target for practicing archery.

== See also ==
- List of islands of South Korea
- Incheon
