= Stall Hill Island =

Island in Bristol County, Massachusetts, United States

Coordinates: 41.874°N 71.000°W

Stall Hill Island is a small forested inland island on Lake Rico within Massasoit State Park in Taunton, Massachusetts, United States.
