= Baemikkumi Sculpture Park =

Sculpture park in Incheon, South Korea

- 배미꾸미조각공원
- Interactive map of Baemikkumi Sculpture Park
- Type: Sculpture park
- Location: 140-41 Modo-ro, Bookdo-myeon, Ongjin-gun, Incheon, South Korea
- Coordinates: 37°31′44″N 126°24′23″E
- Status: Open all year
- Parking: Available

Baemikkumi Sculpture Park (Korean: 배미꾸미조각공원) is a sculpture park on the island Modo in Ongjin County, Incheon, South Korea. The park contains around hundred modern and abstract surrealistic sculptures are displayed on the theme of eroticism.

Incheon International Airport is the nearest site of the park.

== History ==
Lee Il-Ho, a Korean surrealist sculptor, decided to make a personal studio to display his work on Modo. The present sculpture park contains work from other artists.

== In popular culture ==
Baemikkumi sculpture park became popular after its appearance in the Korean romantic drama film Time directed by Kim Ki-duk.
