= Modo Island =

Modo Island may refer to

- Modo, Jindo County, South Korea
- Modo, Ongjin County, South Korea
