= Sipson Island =

Island in Pleasant Bay, Orleans, Massachusetts, with a 25-acre area

Coordinates: 41°44′13″N 69°57′48″W

Sipson Island is an island on the eastern coast of Cape Cod, located on Pleasant Bay in Orleans, Massachusetts. It has a total area of 25 acres (10 ha).

The Island has been privately owned since 1711. It was sold by the Nauset people to English settlers of the Plymouth Colony. In June 2020, the Sipson Island Trust, a non-profit conservation trust, purchased 22 acres of the island, which was put up for sale in 2018, and reopened it to the public for the first time in 300 years. Until its sale, Sipson Island was Cape Cod's last privately owned whole-island property.

Funds were raised from private donations solicited by the Friends of Pleasant Bay and the Compact of Cape Cod Conservation Trusts. At its 2019 town meeting, the government of Orleans decided not to buy a $1.5 million permanent conservation easement that would guarantee public access.

To reach the island, it is necessary to travel by private boat to the eastern shore. Access from the west is by kayak or paddle board. Sipson Island Trust allows only shallow-draft boats under 22 feet to land on the shore in order to protect the natural marine life on the island.
