= Time (2006 film) =

2006 South Korean film by Kim Ki-duk

- Time film poster
- Hangul: 시간
- Hanja: 時間
- RR: Sigan
- MR: Sigan
- Directed by: Kim Ki-duk
- Written by: Kim Ki-duk
- Starring: Ha Jung-woo; Sung Hyun-ah
- Cinematography: Jong-moo Sung
- Distributed by: Sponge; Happinet
- Release date: June 30, 2006
- Running time: 97 minutes
- Countries: Japan; South Korea
- Language: Korean
- Budget: $1 million
- Box office: $185,299

Time is the thirteenth feature film by South Korean director Kim Ki-duk. It premiered at the Karlovy Vary International Film Festival on June 30, 2006.

== Plot ==
Seh-hee and Ji-woo (Ha Jung-woo) are a young couple two years into their relationship. Though he never acts on his impulses, Ji-woo has something of a roving eye and Seh-hee is intensely jealous and fearful that Ji-woo will soon lose interest and leave her. Believing that Ji-woo is bored with seeing the same, boring her all the time, Seh-hee takes drastic action, leaving him without warning and having drastic cosmetic surgery, taking on a new face, which she hopes to use to snare him again, under an assumed identity, once she has healed. But when Ji-woo shows interest in this new and "improved" Seh-hee (Sung Hyun-ah), it triggers only more self-doubt and loathing. After all, he may love the "new" girl, but does this mean that he has rejected the old? Seh-hee is utterly trapped in her own insecurities, a situation that prompts Ji-woo to take drastic action of his own.

== Production ==
Filming locations include Baemikkumi Sculpture Park in South Korea.

== Reception ==
Of 34 critics counted on Rotten Tomatoes, 76% positively reviewed Time, with the critics' consensus being: "A tale of love and plastic surgery, Kim Ki-Duk's haunting film is both wryly comic and disturbing." The film holds a 73/100 on Metacritic.

== Awards and nominations ==
Year	Award	Category	Recipients	Result
2006	Chicago International Film Festival	International Film Competition	Time	Won
2006	Sitges - Catalonian International Film Festival	Best Film	Time	Nominated
2006	Sitges - Catalonian International Film Festival	Best Make-Up	Jin Jang	Won
2006	2nd Pyeongtaek Film Festival	New Currents Best Actor	Ha Jung-woo	Won
2007	27th Oporto International Film Festival	Best Actor	Ha Jung-woo	Won
