= Beer Can Museum =

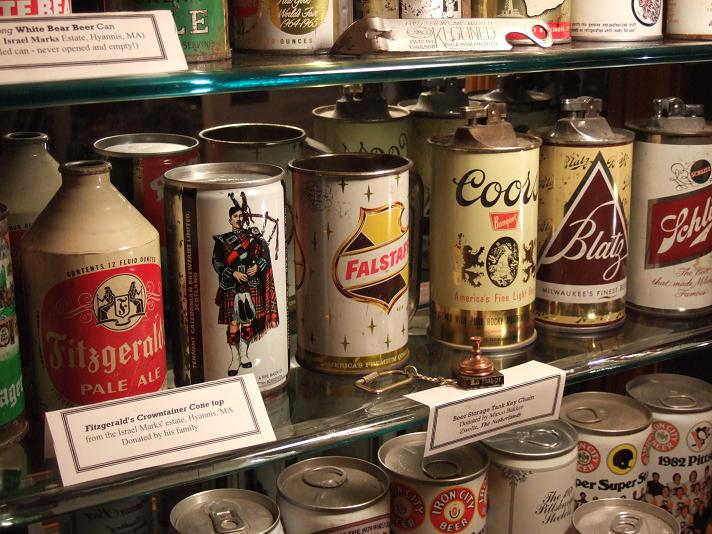
- Beer cans on display at the museum

- Location within Massachusetts
- Established: 1978
- Location: East Taunton, Massachusetts, United States
- Coordinates: 41.8834347°N 71.0286543°W
- Type: Beer museum
- Collections: Beer cans
- Collection size: 5,000
- Director: Kevin Logan
- Website: kevslog.tripod.com/beercanmuseum

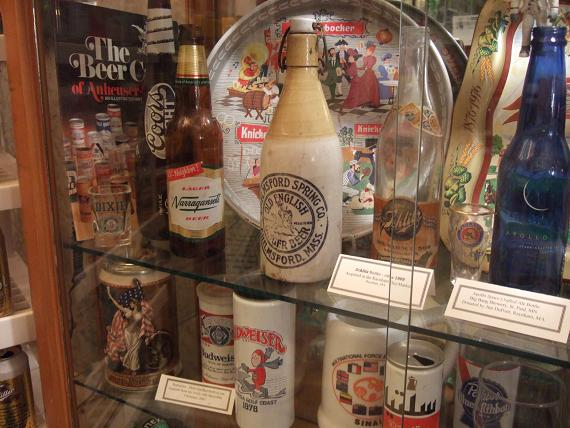
Display case at the Beer Can Museum

The Beer Can Museum, located in East Taunton, Massachusetts, is a collection of more than 5,000 different beer cans, along with beer can folk art and crafts, beer can clothing, beer can telephones and radios, and a beer can and breweriana related library. In November 2013, it was included in Travel & Leisure's list of 'America's Strangest Museums.'

== Contents ==
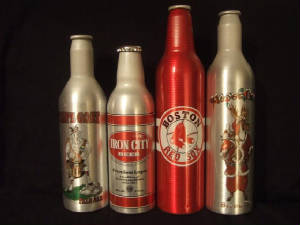
Cabottles at the Museum

Cans dating back to the mid-1930s are on display, as are beer can oddities, test cans, TV and movie props, and obsolete and current trends in beer packaging (e.g. antique cone tops and the newly released alumabottles). The collection is private, but tours can sometimes be arranged by appointment.

The collection was started in 1978 by the museum's director and curator, Kevin Logan. The museum hosts an annual "Museumfest" in the summer, where recent contributors are treated to a barbecue, museum tours, and an awards ceremony.

The oldest can in the collection is a Krueger Ale can from the 1930s which is similar to the first beer can ever produced in 1935. On display as well are older cone tops (such as a Brockert Ale "J-Spout" can from Worcester, Massachusetts, and a Star Banner Ale cone top from Boston) and obsolete "flat top" cans from the early days of beer can production. The museum is enhanced by a significant collection of breweriana (beer related collectibles) such as hanging pub towels in the rafters, thousands of coasters or "beer mats", beer trays, and a bar displaying both colorful cans and beer glasses from around the world. Crocheted beer can hats from the 1970s, beer can transistor radios, and a beer can telephone are also on display, as are miniature beer cans used in dollhouses. A unique 'pysanka' (painted Ukrainian style 'Heineken' egg) is also housed at the museum.

== See also ==
- List of food and beverage museums
