= Sindo (island) =

Island in South Korea

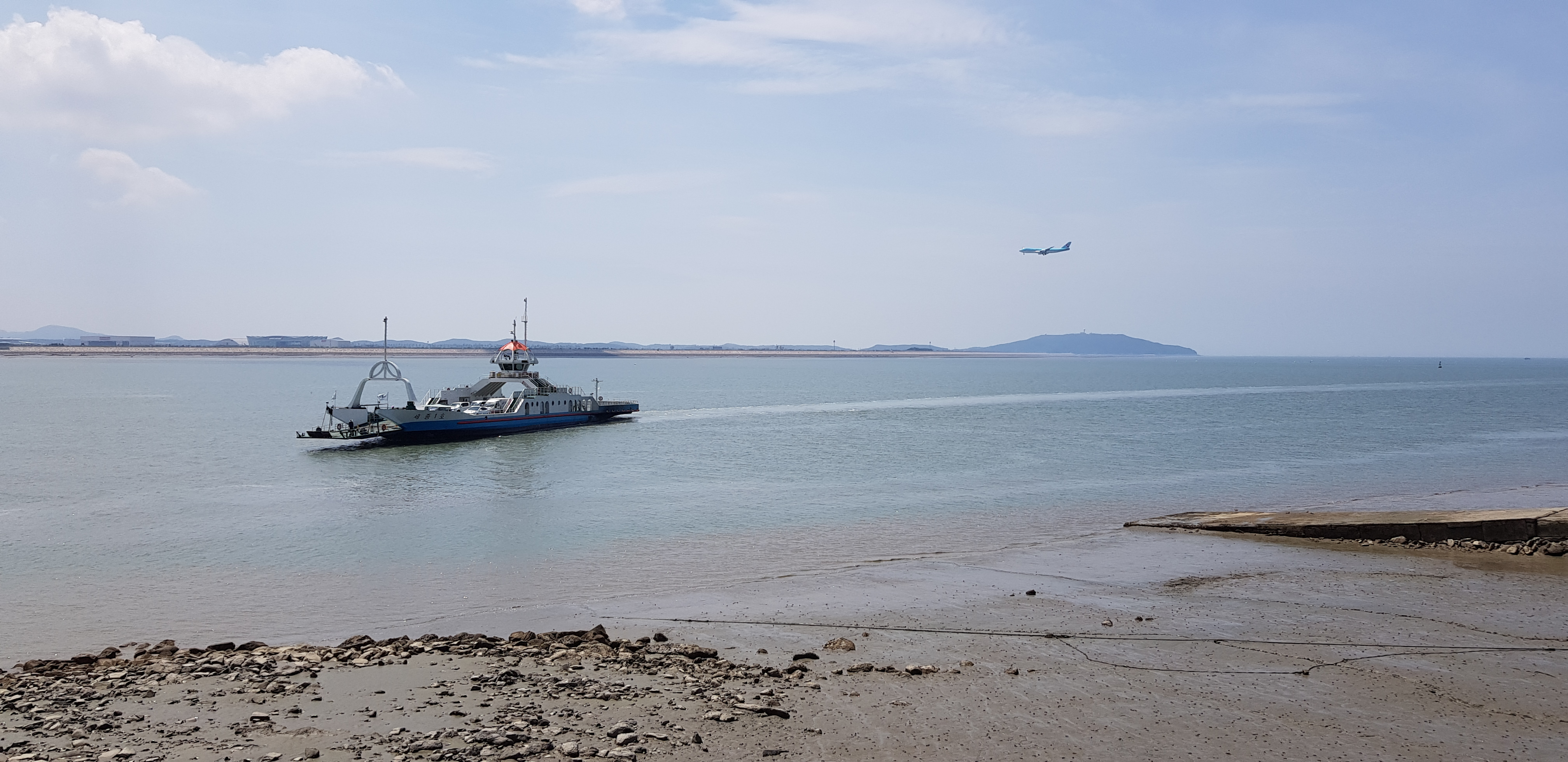
- Off the shore of the island (2018)
- Interactive map of Sindo

Geography
- Coordinates: 37°32′N 126°27′E

Korean name
- Hangul: 신도
- Hanja: 信島
- RR: Sindo
- MR: Sindo

Sindo (Korean: 신도; lit. 'trust island'), also known as Jinyeom, is an island in Sindo-ri, Bukdo-myeon, Ongjin County, Incheon, South Korea.

The island is accessible via a ferry from Yeongjongdo, and is connected to its neighboring islands Sido and Modo via the Yeondo Bridge.

== Description ==
The island's name means "trust island"; it is said this is because the people of Sindo are reputed to be kind and generous.

Sindo has an area of 7.16 km^{2} (2.76 mi^{2}) and a coastline of 16.1 km (10.0 mi). Much of the island has gentle rolling hills, although the 178 m (584 ft) mountain Gubongsan (구봉산; 九峰山) exists in the west. Gubongsan has a gentle hiking path that offers views of Yeongjongdo.

In 2010, it had a population of 809, with 401 males and 408 females. There are settlements on the south, east, and west coasts. Most of the island is covered in dense forests; a fraction of it is used for growing rice and other various crops. Fishing is also conducted, although agriculture is reportedly the primary economic activity of the island.

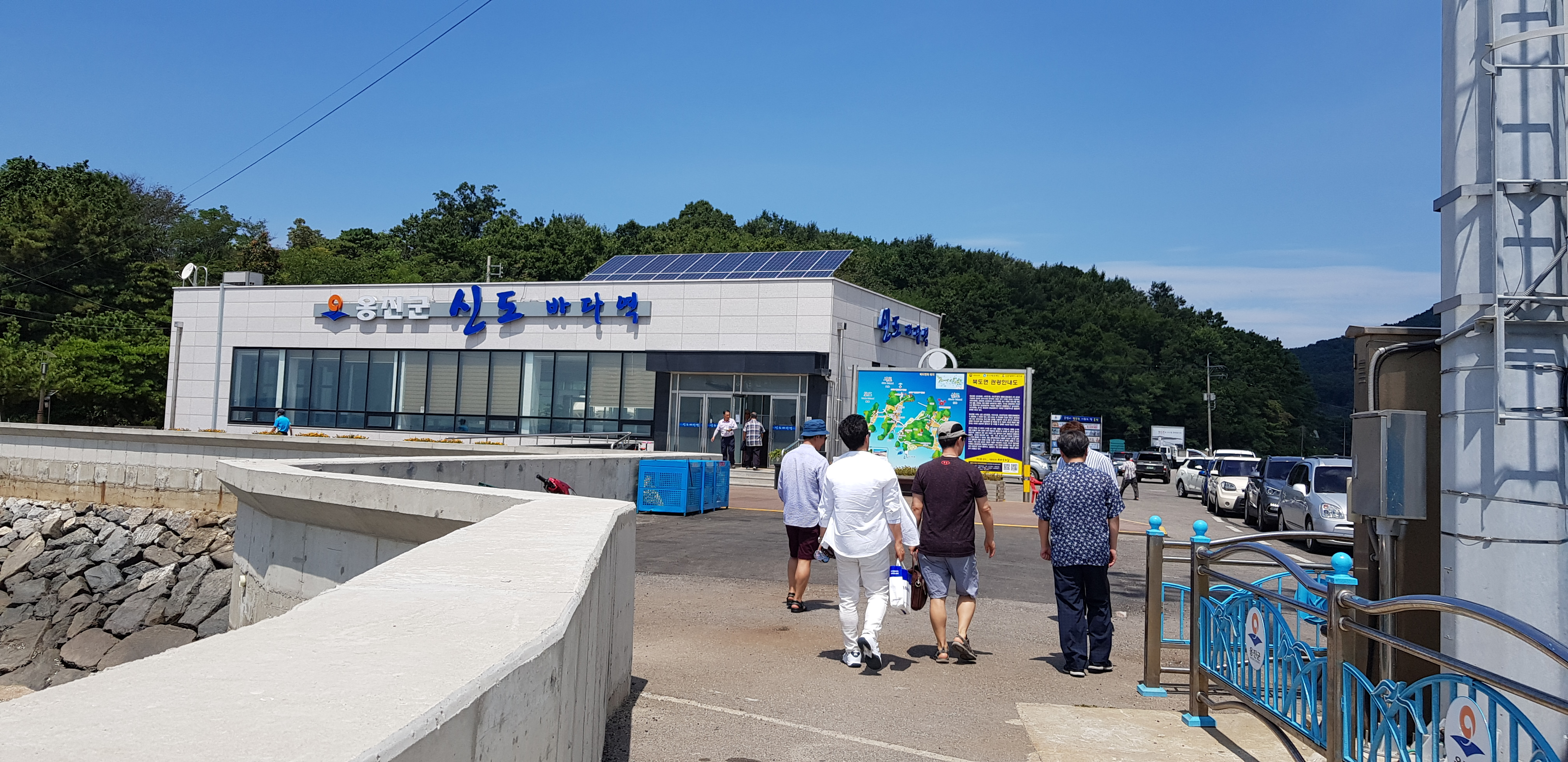
Arrival point on the island (2018)

It is connected to the nearby Sido via the Yeondo Bridge, which was built in 1992. A ferry service runs between the island and Yeongjongdo. The island is reportedly popular with cyclists, as they can take their bikes on the ferries and ride over the bridges to the other islands.

== History ==
During 1231–1270 Mongol invasions of Korea in the Goryeo period, refugees from Ganghwa Island settled on Sindo.

During the 1910–1945 Japanese colonial period, a gold rush occurred in the island. During the 1950–1953 Korean War, refugees fleeing the conflict settled on the island.
