= Sans Souci Island =

Coordinates: 42°30′57″N 92°22′13″W

Sans Souci Island is an island in the Cedar River in the city of Waterloo, Iowa. The island is 100 acres (40 ha) in size, with most of the land area being woodland. The island was severely affected by the Iowa flood of 2008. By June 10, 2008, the island's entire population was forced to evacuate following the breach of a sandbag dike. Prior to the flood, the island had a population of between 40 and 50 residents. All homes were demolished in 2008 due to extensive flood damage, and the island was converted into a recreation area.

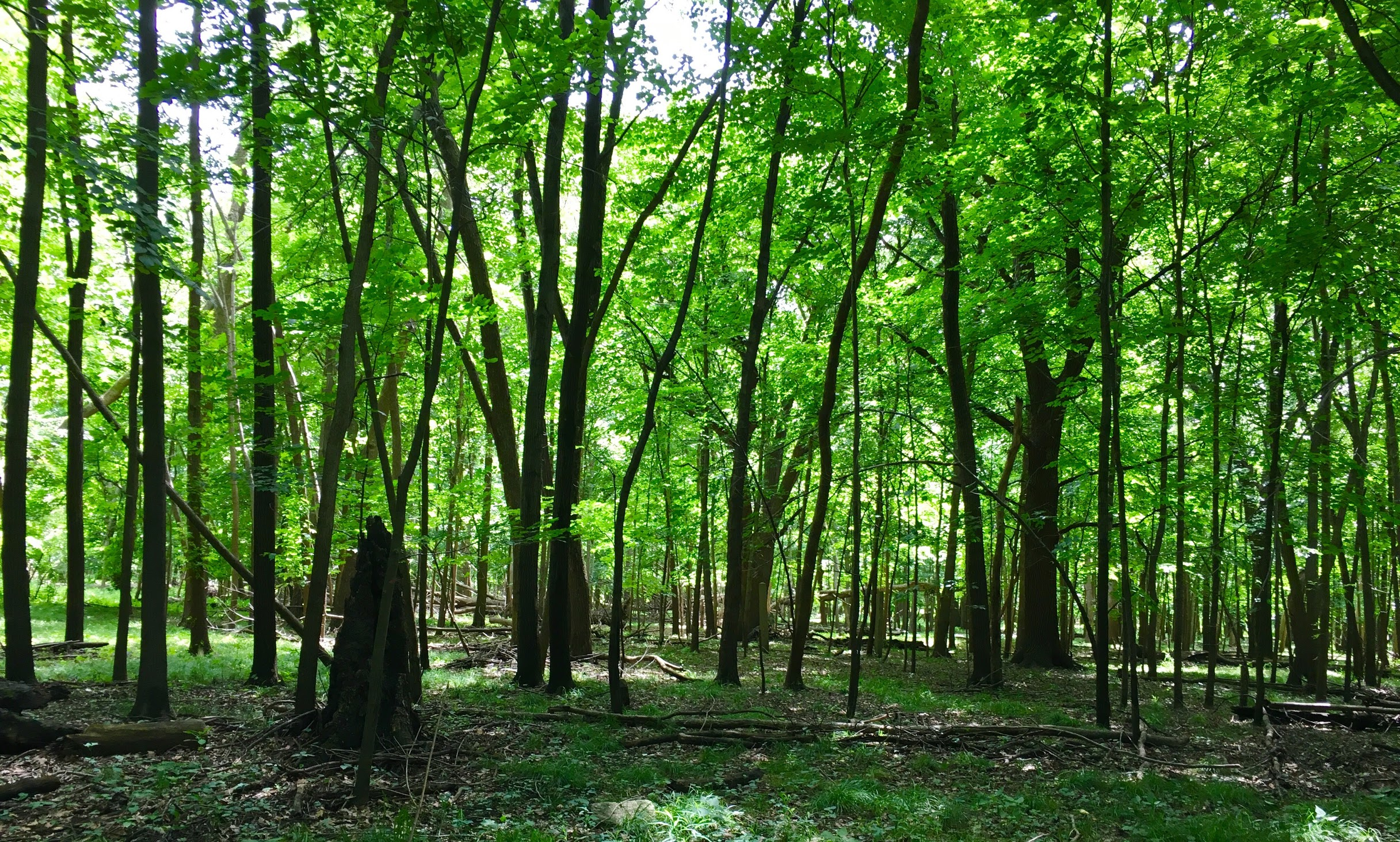
Sans Souci Island trail in center of island

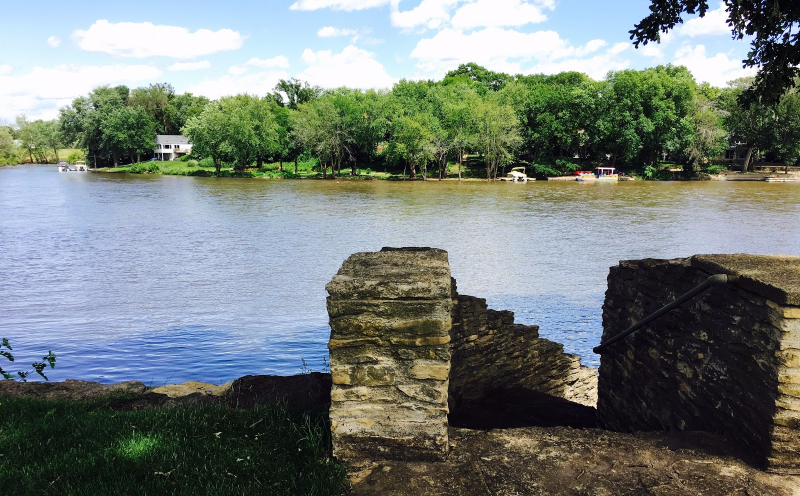
A set of stone stairs on the Eastern shore of Sans Souci Island in Waterloo, Iowa

== See also ==
- Waterloo, Iowa
- Iowa flood of 2008
- Cedar River
