= Stora Förö =

Island in Sweden

Coordinates: 57°37′40″N 11°50′50″E

Stora Förö is a small island in the Southern Gothenburg Archipelago.

In 1975, a construction project at the island was halted after an aurochs skeleton was found containing two arrowheads. Scientific analysis at the Gothenburg Natural History Museum dated the bones to 4,000 years ago.

An oil spill was discovered at the island in 2015.
