= Smooth Island (Ontario) =

Island in Lake Huron, Canada

Coordinates: 44.8950000°N 79.9091666°W

Smooth Island is an island in the Georgian Bay of Lake Huron, in Ontario.

== Geography ==
Smooth Island forms the southwestern side of the Minnicog Channel. The island is 0.2 miles (0.32 km) southwest of Minnicognashene Island. It is approximately 180 metres (590 ft) above sea level. Numerous shoals are in the vicinity of the island.

Since 2012, Smooth Island has had a small bay with a sandy bottom. This bay has persistently low water levels. The island is 1400 yards long and 350 yards wide. Its height is 20 yards.

Smooth Island has some sparse woods. A bay on the island has dense populations of bulrushes, grasses, bushes, and reeds, which are able to grow there due to the low water levels. There are a number of small rocks on the southeastern side of the island. Additionally, dry rocks extend almost 0.6 miles (0.97 km) beyond its northwestern edge.

Some rocks near Smooth Island include Mohawk Rock and Skylark Rock.
