= Allied Boat Company =

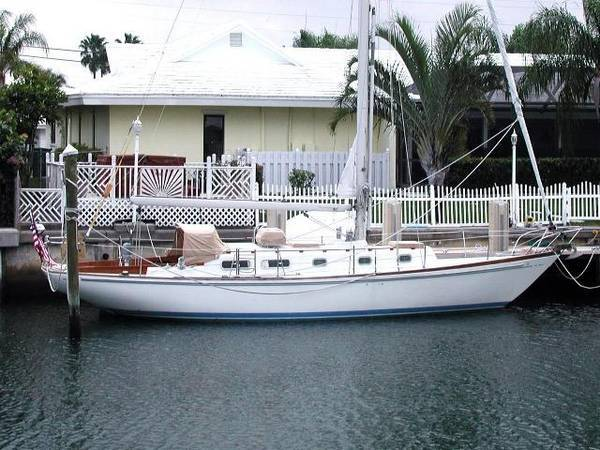
Sparkman & Stephens Allied 42 XL-2

Allied Boat Company was a small manufacturer of fiberglass sailboats built in Catskill, New York. The first design was by Thomas Gillmer in 1960, the 30-foot Seawind. The first hull, Apogee became the first fiberglass boat to circumnavigate the globe in 1968. The company officially formed on February 9, 1962. Until 1981, they built various designs from 30 to 42 feet by naval architects such as Sparkman & Stephens, Bill Luders, and Frank Maclear/Robert Harris. The company went out business four times during the later years. The level of finish below was known to vary in quality. Poor management contributed to their economic woes.

== Boats ==
- Greenwich 24
