= Saarnaki laid =

Island in Estonia

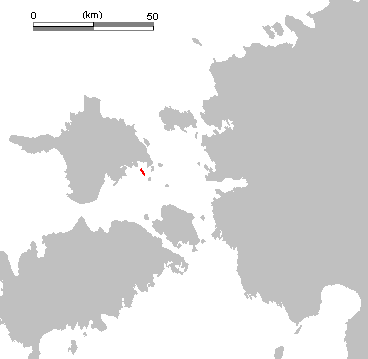
Saarnaki laid shown in red

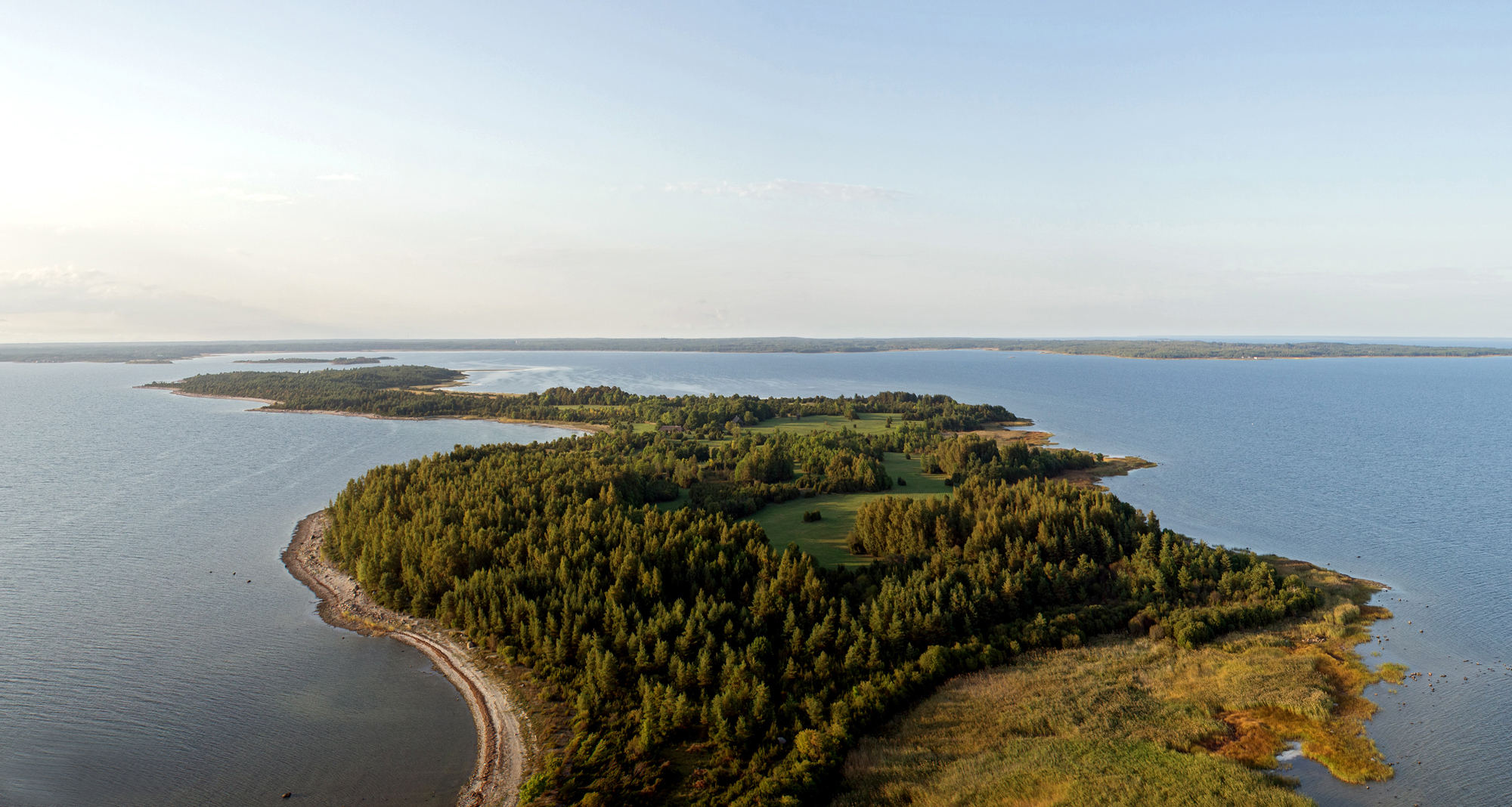
Aerial photograph of Saarnaki laid

Saarnaki laid is an inhabited, moraine-based island in the Baltic Sea belonging to the country of Estonia. Its coordinates are 58°48′38″N 22°59′37″E.

Saarnaki laid is a relatively young island; it rose from the Baltic Sea approximately 2,000 years ago. The total area of the island is 140 hectares (350 acres). The island is 5 kilometres (3 mi) long and 1 kilometre (1/2 mi) wide. It is 7 to 9 metres (23 to 30 ft) above sea level. It lies just off the southeastern coast of the island of Hiiumaa, and is administrated by Hiiu County.

Saarnaki laid had previously been inhabited at least since the early 15th-century and was abandoned by the last residents in 1973. It is the largest of the islands that make up the Hiiumaa Islets Landscape Reserve (Estonian: Hiiumaa laidude maastikukaitseala) and several former residential and farm buildings on the island have been restored for the benefit of tourists.

== Gallery ==
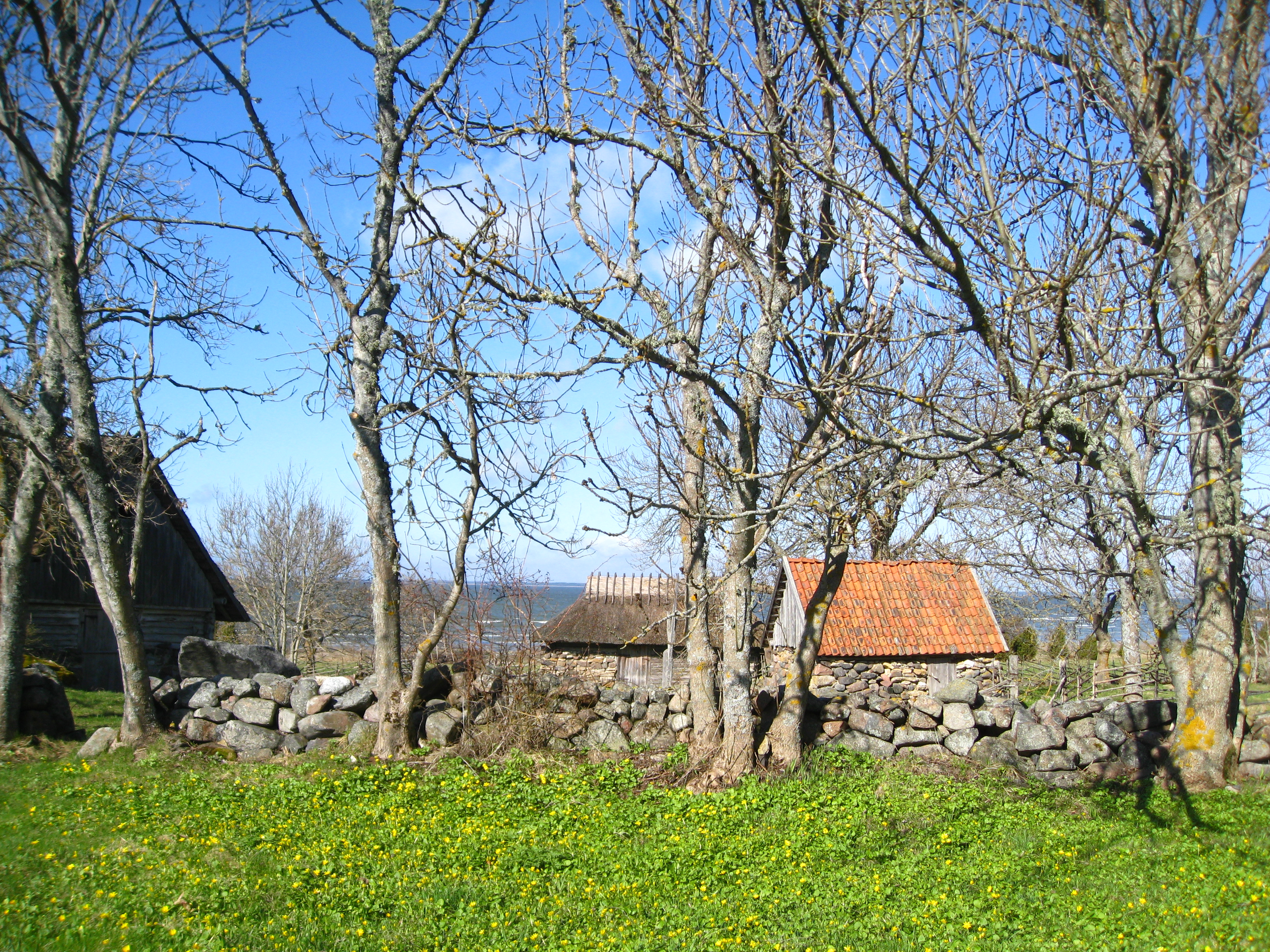

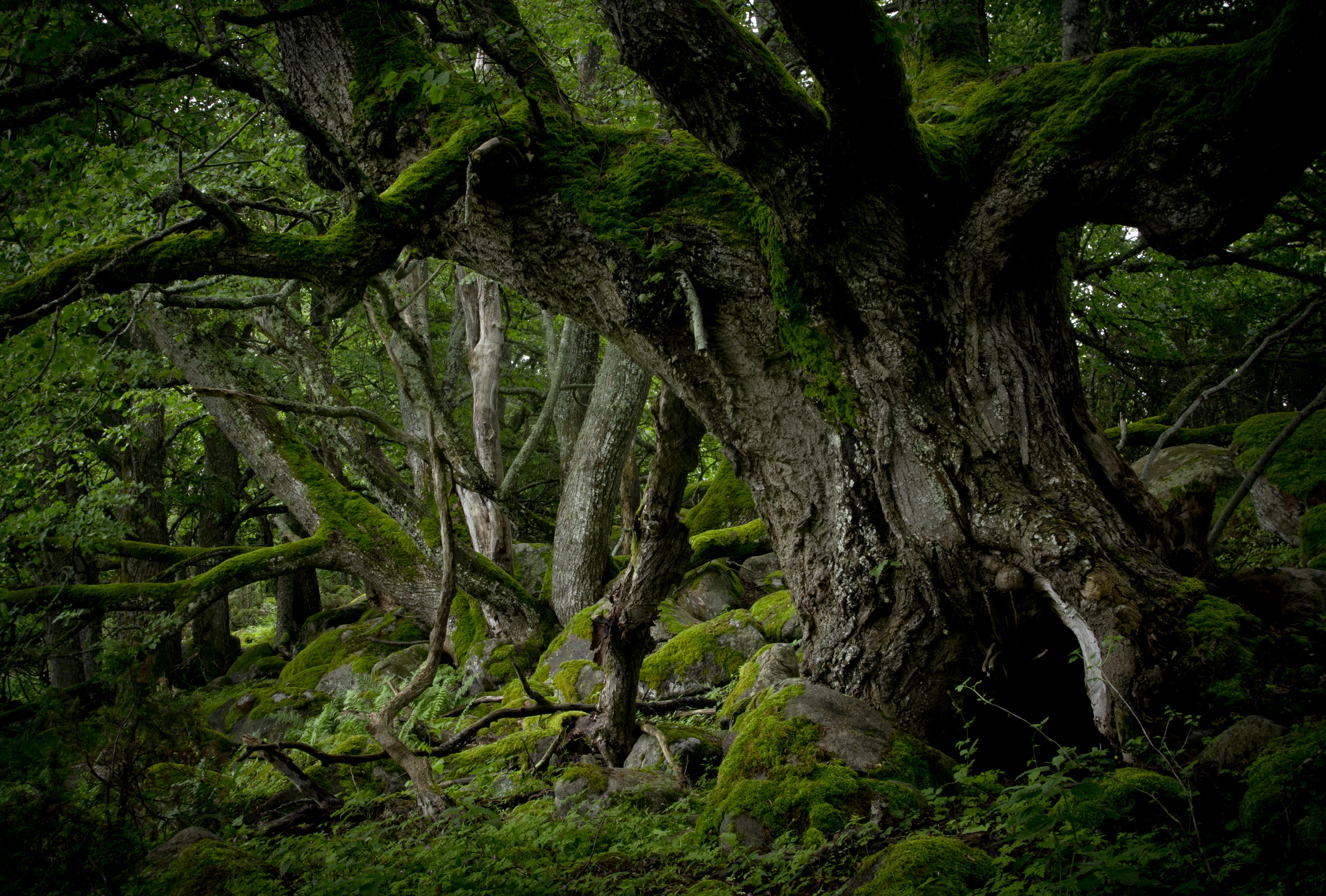

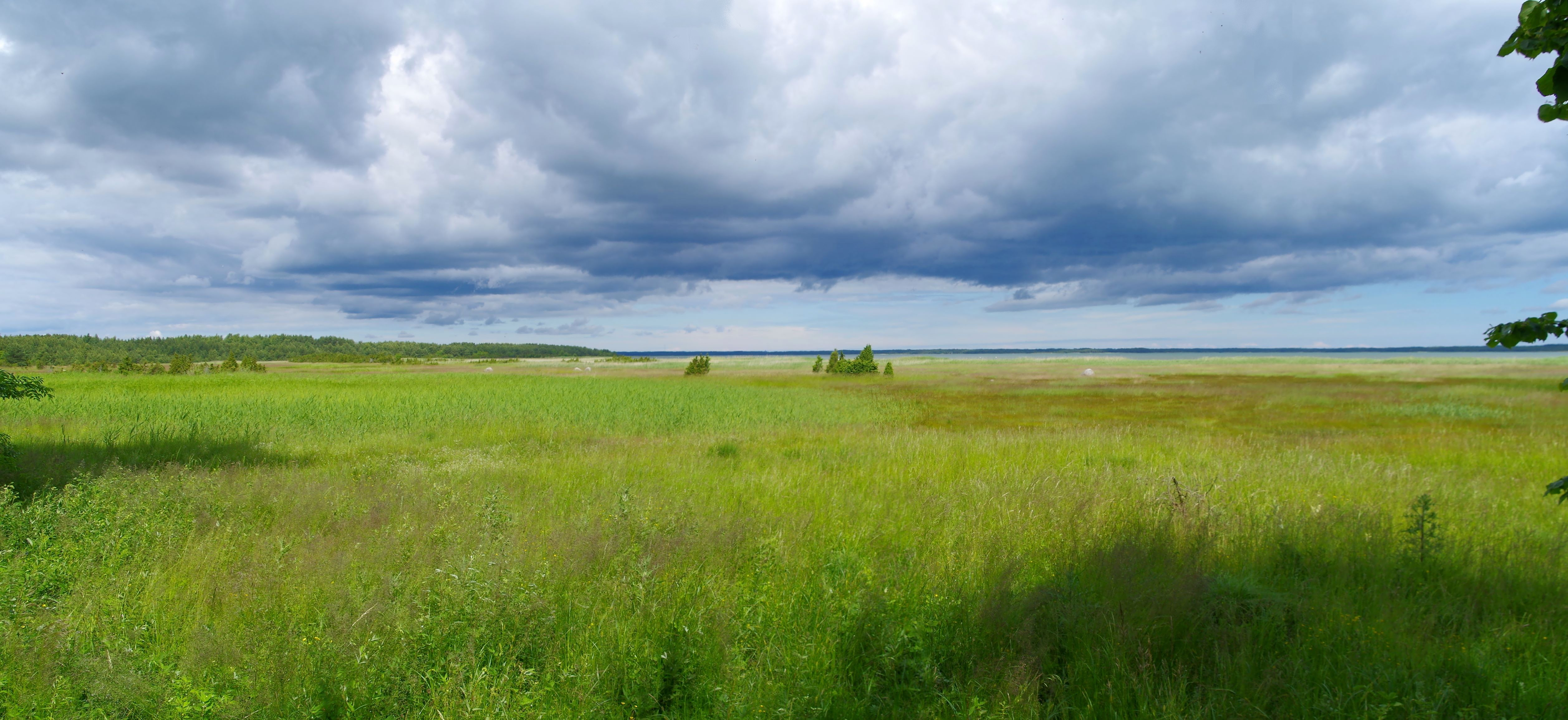

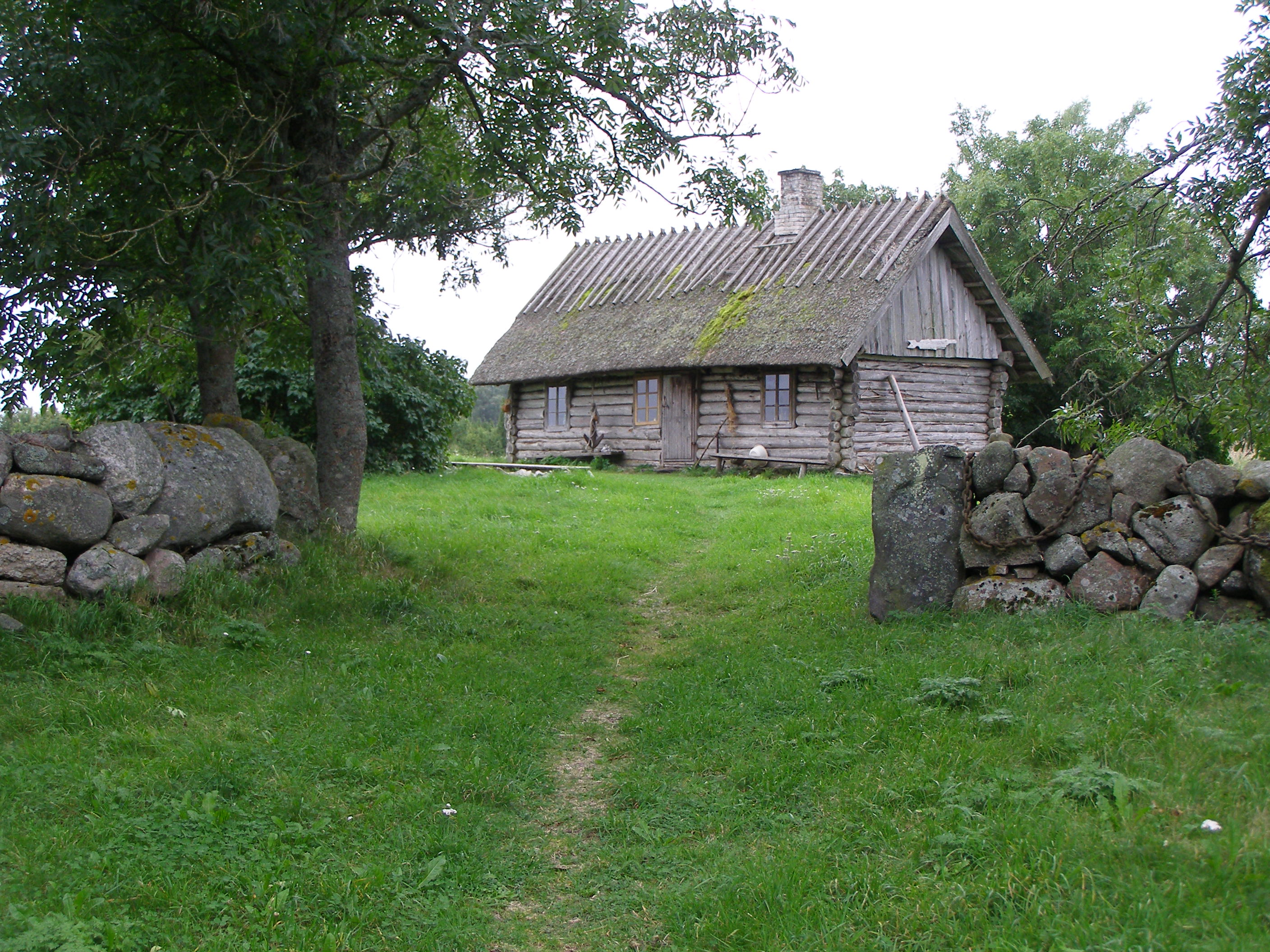

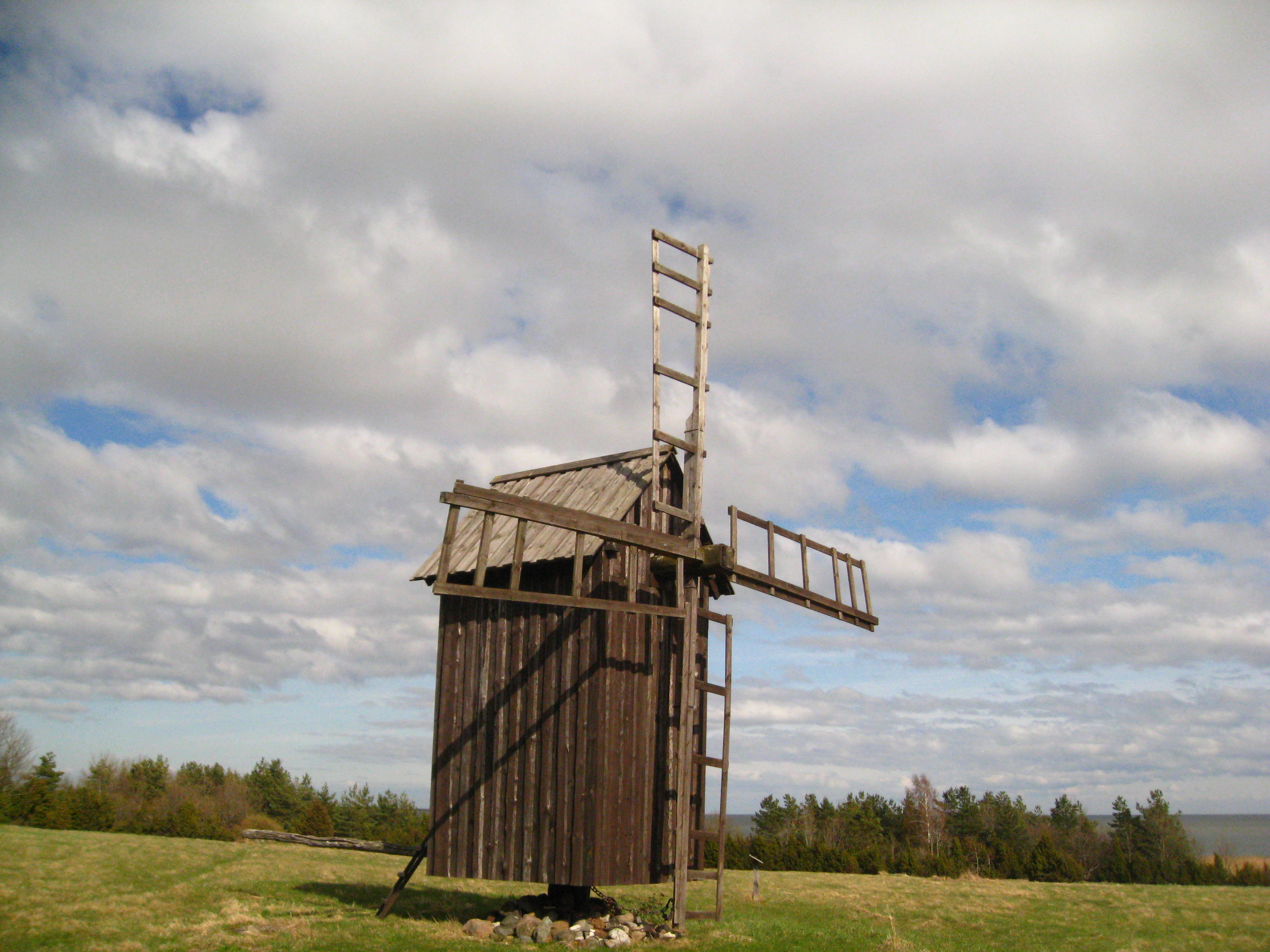

== See also ==
- List of islands of Estonia
