= Middle Savage Islands =

Island group in Nunavut, Canada

- Location in Nunavut

Geography
- Location: Hudson Strait
- Coordinates: 62°08′35″N 067°56′59″W

Administration
- Canada
- Nunavut: Nunavut
- Region: Qikiqtaaluk

Demographics
- Population: Uninhabited
- Source: Middle Savage Islands at Atlas of Canada

The Middle Savage Islands are a group of islands, part of Canadian territory.

One of the Baffin Island offshore island groups, the Middle Savage Islands are located in Hudson Strait, southwest of Bond Inlet. They are part of the Qikiqtaaluk Region, in the Canadian territory of Nunavut. Saddleback Island is the largest member of the group.
