= Pleasant Bay, Cape Cod =

Bay in Massachusetts, United States

Coordinates: 41°43′40.4″N 69°58′48.6″W

Pleasant Bay is a bay of the Atlantic Ocean just north of the "elbow" of Cape Cod in Massachusetts. It is bounded on the east by a long peninsula and a barrier island, and harbors 7,825 acres (31.67 km^{2}) of saltwater when the tide is in.

== History ==
The first people to discover the bay were the Native American tribe the Nausets. They referred to it as Monomoyik which translates to "Great Bay". It is also reported that in this area Squanto, the guide of the Mayflower Pilgrims, is buried. The area is full of artifacts and places which hold the names of these Native American tribes.

== Geography ==
Pleasant Bay is the largest contiguous bay along the Cape Cod National Seashore. It is located along the towns of Orleans, Chatham, Harwich, and a small part of Brewster. It also includes several beaches and islands:

- Nauset Beach
- Barrier Beach
- Monomoy Island
- North Beach Island
- Sipson Island
- Little Sipson Island
- Hog Island
- Sampson Island
- Tern Island
- Pochet Island
- Little Pochet Island
- Strong Island
