= Square Islands =

Islands in Newfoundland and Labrador, Canada

Coordinates: 52°43′49″N 55°49′46″W

Square Islands are located in Newfoundland and Labrador, Canada, close to Charlottetown. The islands were formerly one of the major fishing areas of Labrador, with a harbour which was a key haven from Atlantic storms. The nearby Hawke Basin remains one of the world's principal shrimp fishery areas.

It is believed that extractable reserves of petroleum may lie beneath the ocean bed nearby; the area is also rich in base metals.
