= Lake Rico =

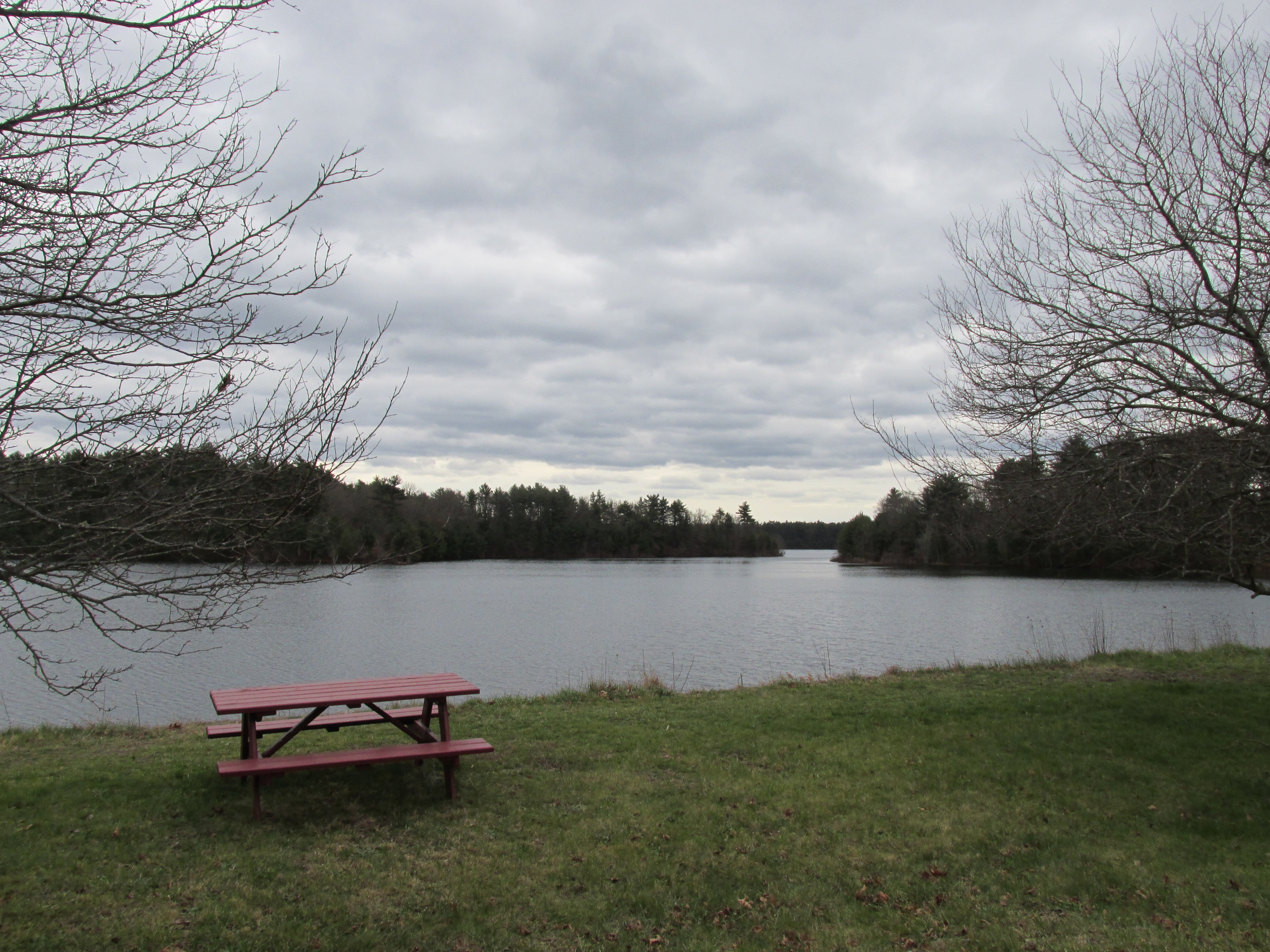

- Location within Massachusetts Location within the United States
- Location: Taunton, Massachusetts
- Coordinates: 41°52′30″N 70°59′43″W
- Type: lake
- Basin countries: United States
- Surface area: 166 acres (67 ha)
- Surface elevation: 30 ft (9 m)
- Islands: Stall Hill Island

Lake Rico, also known as Furnace Pond, is a 166-acre (0.67 km^{2}) freshwater lake within Massasoit State Park in Taunton, Massachusetts. The lake takes up about nearly a quarter of Massasoit State Park. There are many coves, Much of its coastline is heavily forested, although there is a non-designated beach area located at Lake Rico's southeastern coast.

== See also ==
- Massasoit State Park
- Taunton, Massachusetts
- Taunton River
