= St. Helena Island (Maryland) =

St. Helena Island, Maryland
- Interactive map of St. Helena Island, Maryland
- Coordinates: 39°2′28″N 76°33′53″W
- Country: United States
- State: Maryland
- County: Anne Arundel
- Elevation: 33 ft (10 m)
- Time zone: UTC-5 (Eastern (EST))
  - Summer (DST): UTC-4 (EDT)
- ZIP code: 21032
- Area code: 410

St. Helena Island is situated between Round Bay and Little Round Bay in the Severn River, 5 miles (8.0 km) upstream from Annapolis, Maryland and 17 miles (27 km) south of Baltimore, Maryland.

== History ==
Shards, clay pottery shards, stone chips, and grooved axes are evidence of the Woodland period peoples and later Native Americans who have occupied the island. It is thought that St. Helena and other small islands were used to hide from raiding Susquehannocks.

Anne Arundel County, Maryland records in the Annapolis Land Office identify the first traces of the island in 1843 when it was part of the estate of the late Annapolitan Major Richard I. Jones. An article from The Washington Post mentions "Uncle Tom" and the Chesapeake Fishing Club spending time on the island during the summer months of 1895, but it is not until nearly 40 years later that there is regular activity on St. Helena Island.

Paul Burnett, a Baltimore city attorney and insurance executive, purchased the island in the late 1920s. Claims that he named the island St. Helena as a tribute to his former law partner, a great-great nephew of Napoleon Bonaparte are not true; an 1846 map and the 1860 Martenet map both label the island "St. Helena."

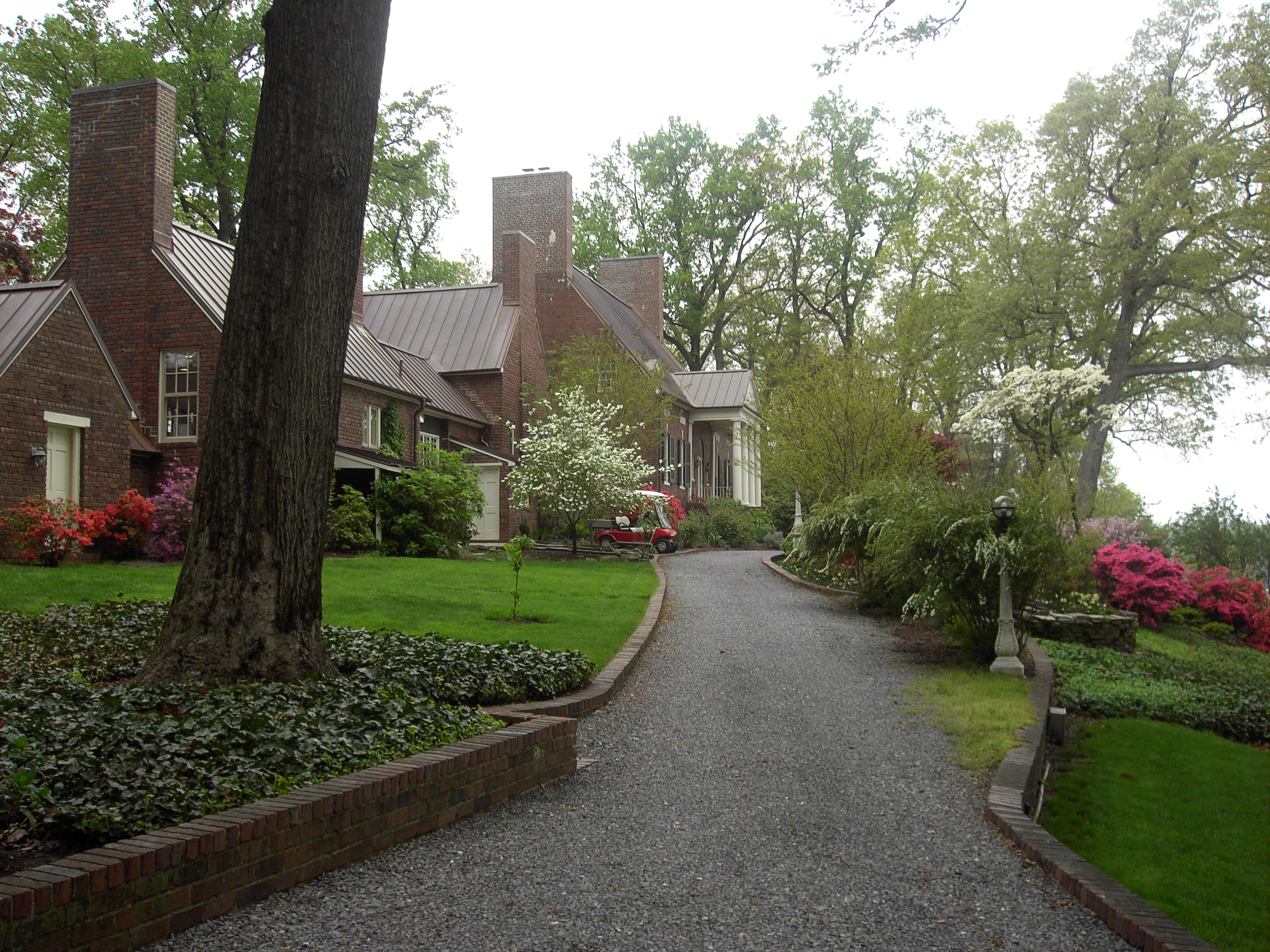
The mansion built by Paul Burnett between 1929 and 1931.

Between 1929–1931, Burnett built a Federal Period mansion, part of the early-twentieth-century classical revival movement, modeled after the Homewood Museum on the Johns Hopkins University campus in Baltimore. He commissioned bay schooners to carry the tons of bricks necessary to build it. The mansion, built on a Palladian style five-part plan, occupies the crest of the island and is the centerpiece of St. Helena. There are six fireplaces, each in a different type of marble imported from Europe: many of the floors on the main level are marble checkerboards. Other flooring is made from inch-thick mahogany which dented the tools of electricians and telephone mechanics who attempted to string new wiring in the 1950s. There are also several safes built into the masonry, scattered throughout the house, including a walk-in size safe in the den. Several other homes on the island served as housing for patients and counselors of the Burnett Hospital for Crippled Children, which operated from 1936–1943. There are 22 structures total scattered through the island. There is also a conical roofed and a circular brick water tower on the northern point of the island, converted to an office with a view.

Following Burnett's death in 1944, the island was sold to Eugene Raney, a beer distributor and operator of several bowling alleys in Maryland but who resided in Kensington, MD (Montgomery County). Raney leased several buildings, one of which would become a restaurant, to John Emory, well known for his Four Corners' restaurant in Silver Spring, Maryland. During this period, St. Helena was recognized for its swanky island club, boasting a casino and regularly hosting members of Congress, judges, and other prominent citizens, including Governor William Preston Lane Jr. The club was also home to several slot machines. In 1951 five nickel and two quarter slot machines, as well as two nickel "bandits" were seized in a police raid. Both Raney and Emory were taken into custody and later convicted of slot-machine violations. The owner of the machines, Nick Andrews of Glen Burnie, Maryland, was also convicted for illegal operation of slot machines on the island.

In 1953, County Manager Edward R. Lonergan proposed that St. Helena Island be purchased by the State as the site of an institution for the criminally insane, describing it as “a sort of Alcatraz of Maryland.” The island was subdivided and sold in 1956, to Court of Appeals Judge Stedman Prescott, Jr., Emmitt Brandt, president of Annapolis Utilities and Robert Merrick, chairman of the board of Equitable Trust.

In 1958, Broadwater, Inc., working with Eva Gude Brandt (wife of Emmitt Brandt), intended to develop the island "as an exclusive residential area."

Judge Prescott notably commuted from the island to his Annapolis courthouse office by helicopter when the river froze over. In September 1961 Judge Prescott nearly lost his island mansion to a fire started by malfunctioning electrical equipment. The fire was brought under control by nearly 100 fireman rushed to the island by private boats from Herald Harbor, Maryland.

Ophthalmologist Charles E. Iliff, III, M.D. purchased the mansion along with other lots on the north end of the island from Judge Prescott's estate in the early 1970s. By 1976, Iliff had purchased additional lots from Broadwater, Inc., south of the mansion. In 1987, Dr. Iliff sold the mansion to Chris Coile, a Realtor.

In 1995, Coile sold the mansion to Keith Osborne of Fantasy Island Management Inc. Osborne promoted the 6.5-acre (26,000 m^{2}) estate as a wedding and event center. After a great deal opposition from neighbors, the Severn River Association voted to oppose all commercial activity on the island in November 1999. Osborne stirred up more controversy in 2001, when he sold his portion of the island to the Hartman family and later that year, attempted to sue his former St. Helena neighbors Mary-Anne and Walter D. Pinkard Jr. and his brothers, Robert and Gregory Pinkard. The case was dropped and in 2002 Osborne was sentenced to 18 months in federal prison for tax evasion.

The Hartman family sold the mansion to the Clickners, who also owned Dobbins Island in the Magothy River. In 2025, the Clickners sold the mansion to Mikell and Katherine Perry.

== Geography ==
St. Helena Island is bordered on the east and south by the two-mile (3 km)-wide Round Bay, the only part of the generally straight and relatively narrow tidal Severn River to exceed three-quarters of a mile in width. Little Round Bay borders the island on the north and west and may have been a meander during a time when sea level was lower and the Severn was a freshwater river. Maynadier and Hopkins Creeks are 0.3 to 0.4 miles southwest of the southern tip of the island.

Vertical buffs on the western, northern, and northeastern portions of the island range from 30 to 50 feet (15 m) in height. A 10–15 foot-wide beach can be found on the western side of the island and in the cove on the northeast side. The maximum elevation on the island is 52 feet (16 m). St. Helena has only lost about 2 of its 21.5 acres (87,000 m^{2}) in the last 150 years.

== Wildlife ==
St. Helena is home to a variety of ducks, geese, great blue herons, kingfishers, ospreys and other birds. The island was formerly the setting for deer park.
