= Savage Island (Alaska) =

Island in Alaska, United States

Savage Island is a small island in the Near Islands group of the Aleutian Islands in the U.S. state of Alaska. A satellite island of Attu Island, it is situated at 52°48′05″N 173°04′32″E in Temnac Bay on the south side of Attu. It was named by the U.S. Army during its occupation of the island during World War II.

== See also ==
- River island
- Denali National Park and Preserve
