= Massasoit State Park =

State park in Massachusetts, United States

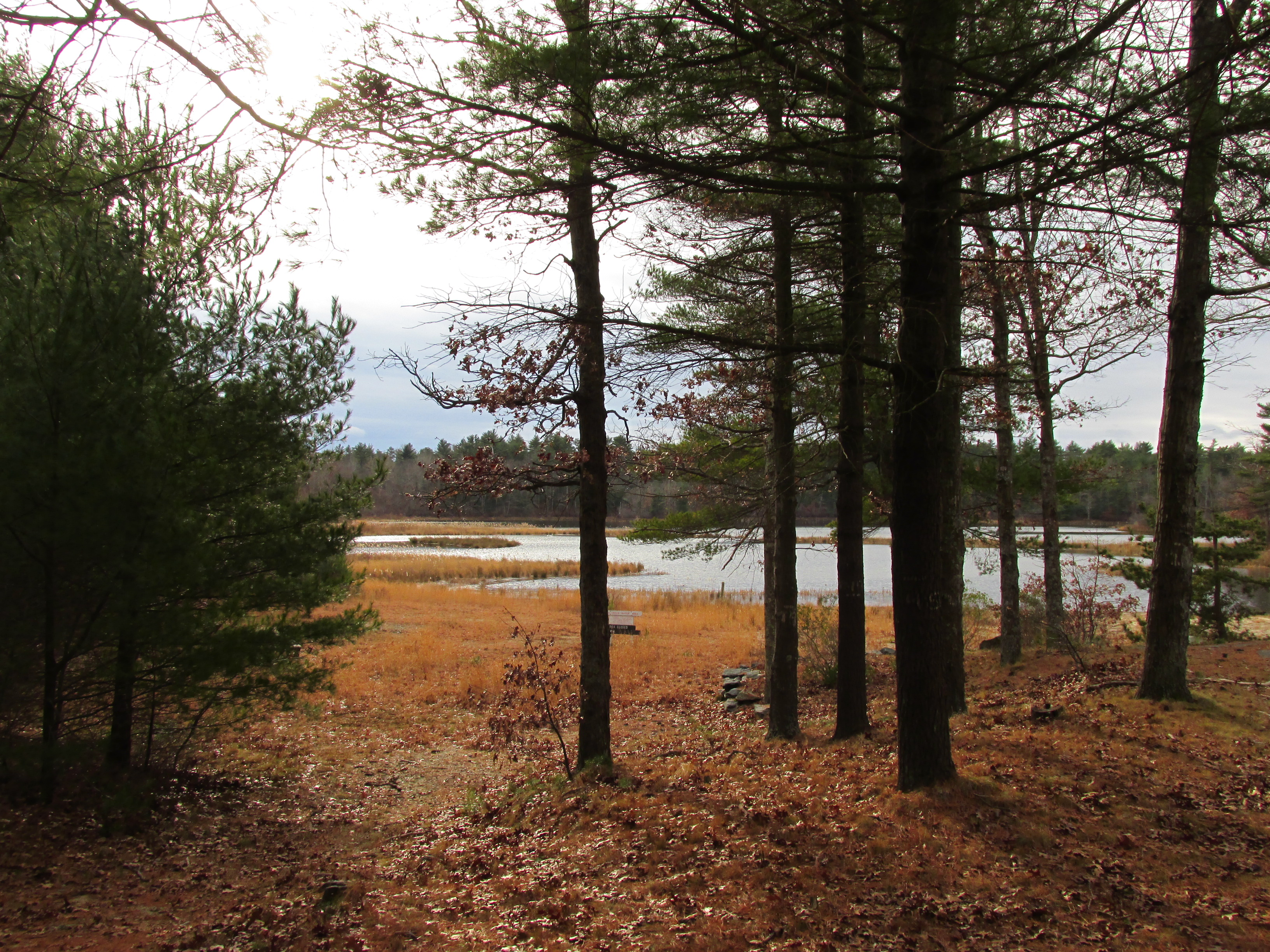
- Middle Pond

- Location within Massachusetts Location within the United States
- Location: Taunton, Massachusetts, United States
- Coordinates: 41°52′04″N 70°59′24″W
- Area: 1,207 acres (488 ha)
- Elevation: 39 ft (12 m)
- Administrator: Massachusetts Department of Conservation and Recreation
- Website: Official website

Massasoit State Park is a public recreation area located on the southeast side of the city of Taunton, Massachusetts, with some parklands spilling into the adjacent town of Lakeville. The state park encompasses more than 1200 heavily wooded acres that include six lakes and ponds (Lake Rico, Furnace Pond, King's Pond, Middle Pond, Little Bearhole Pond, and Big Bearhole Pond) and numerous cranberry bogs.

== Features ==
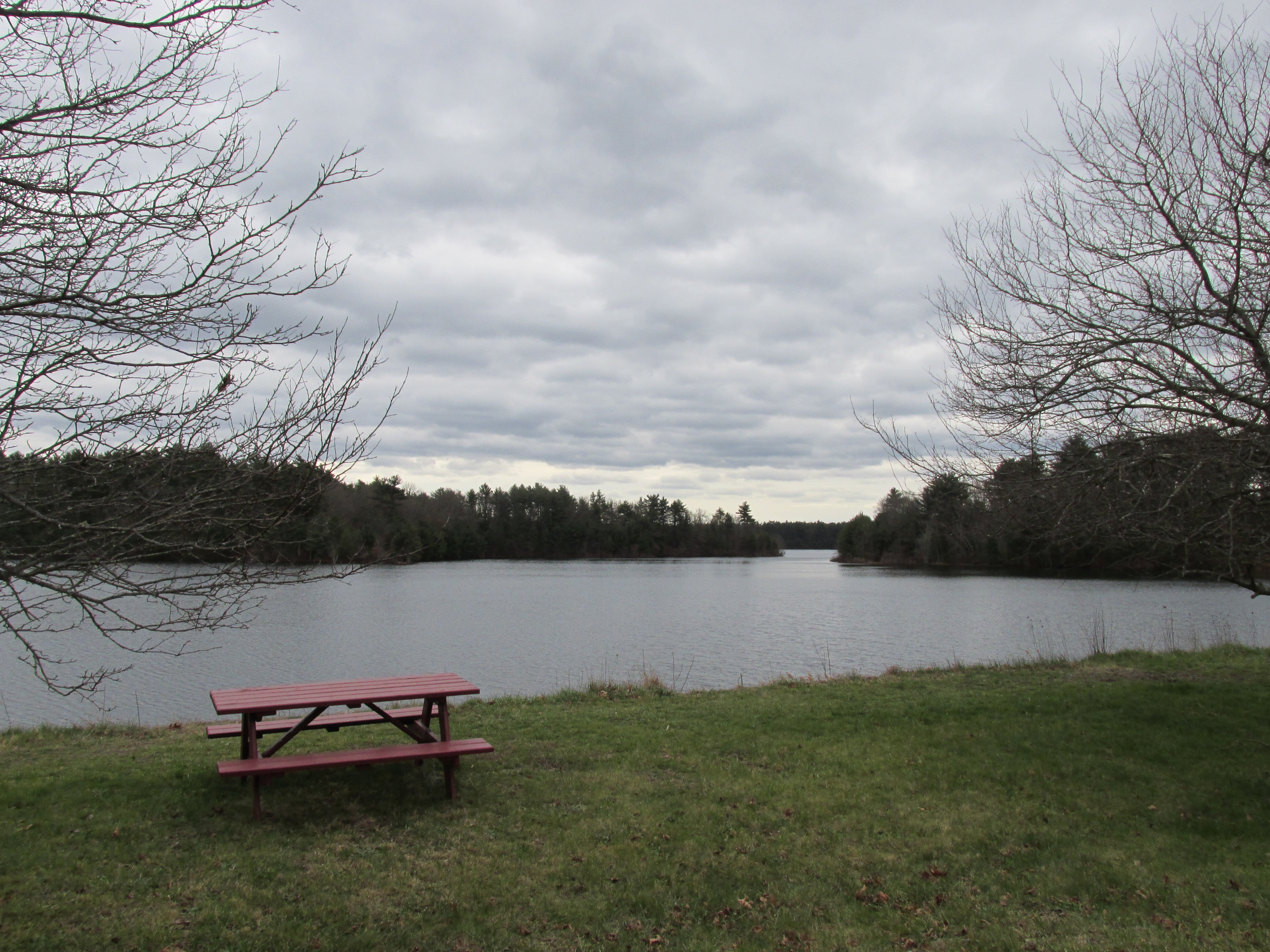
Lake Rico

The park has an extensive trail system for walking, hiking, biking, cross-country skiing, and equestrian use. A launch for non-motorized boats is located at the north end of Lake Rico. A fisherman's landing is found on Big Bearhole Pond. Hunting is available on a restricted basis.

== 2008 lightning strike ==
A lightning strike in 2008 disabled the park's underground electric system, resulting in the closure of much of the park. Interior sections were reopened to vehicular traffic in 2015, with the reopening of the park's 126-site campground in remaining as a long-term goal, according to officials. The park later reopened completely in 2018.
