= Modo, Ongjin =

Island in Incheon, South Korea

Modo
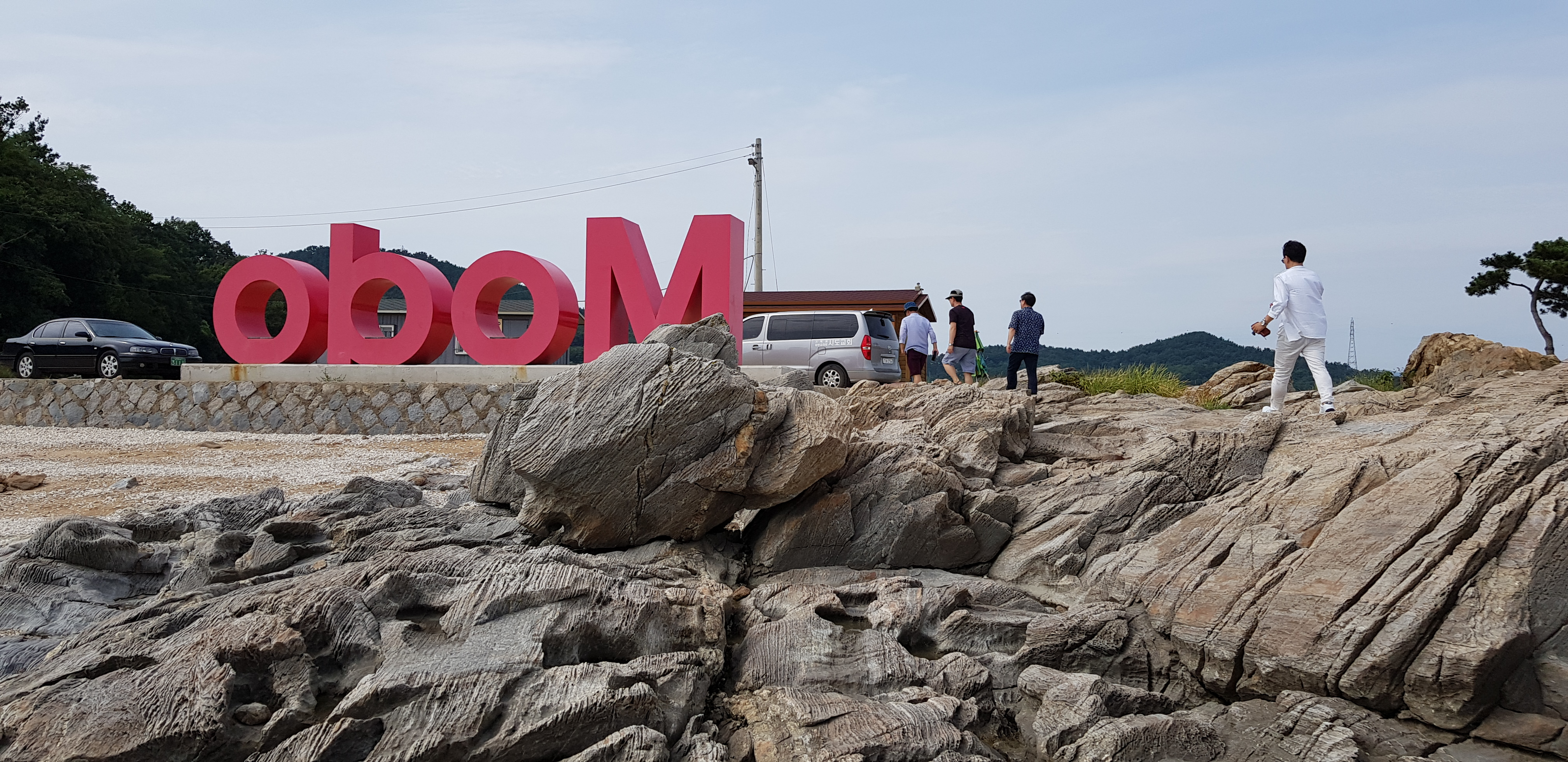
- On the shore of the island (2018)
- Interactive map of Modo

Geography
- Coordinates: 37.53°N 126.41°E

Korean name
- Hangul: 모도
- Hanja: 茅島
- RR: Modo
- MR: Modo

Modo (Korean: 모도) is a small island in Bukdo-myeon, Ongjin County, Incheon, South Korea. It is in Ganghwa Bay.

Baemikkumi Sculpture Park is in the southern part of the island.
