= List of islands in the Pacific Ocean =

The islands in the Pacific Ocean divided into three major groups

The islands in the Pacific Ocean are categorized into three major island groups: Melanesia, Micronesia, and Polynesia. Depending on the context, the term Pacific Islands may refer to one of several concepts: (1) those Pacific islands whose people have Austronesian origins, (2) the Pacific islands once or currently colonized after 1500 CE, (3) the geographical region of Oceania, or (4) any island located in the Pacific Ocean. Inhabitants of the Pacific islands are known as Pacific Islanders.

This list of islands in the Pacific Ocean is organized by archipelago or political boundary. In order to keep this list of moderate size, the more complete lists for countries with large numbers of small or uninhabited islands have been hyperlinked.

== Name ambiguity and groupings ==
A commonly applied biogeographic definition includes islands with oceanic geology that lie within Melanesia, Micronesia, Polynesia and the eastern Pacific (also known as the southeastern Pacific). These are usually considered to be the "Tropical Pacific Islands". In the 1990s, ecologists Dieter Mueller-Dombois and Frederic Raymond Fosberg broke the Tropical Pacific Islands up into the following subdivisions:

- Western Melanesia
  - The Bismarck Archipelago and other islands directly east of New Guinea
  - Bougainville and Buka Island
  - The Solomon Islands
- Eastern Melanesia
  - The Santa Cruz Islands
  - Vanuatu
  - New Caledonia
  - Fiji
- Subtropical islands in the Australia/New Zealand region
  - Lord Howe Island
  - Norfolk Island
- Micronesia
  - The Bonin Islands and Volcano Islands
  - Minamitorishima
  - The Northern Marianas
  - The Southern Marianas
  - The Caroline Islands
  - Nauru and Banaba
  - Wake Island
  - Palau
  - The Marshall Islands
  - The Gilbert Islands (Kiribati)
- Central Polynesia
  - Johnston Atoll
  - The Phoenix Islands
  - The Line Islands
  - Howland Island, Baker Island, Jarvis Island, Malden Island and Starbuck Island
  - Tuvalu, Tokelau and the Northern Cook Islands (Pukapuka, Nassau, Rakahanga, Manihiki, Penrhyn, Suwarrow and Palmerston)
- Western Polynesia
  - Tonga
  - Samoan Islands
  - Wallis and Futuna
  - Niue
- Eastern Polynesia
  - The rest of the Cook Islands
  - The Austral Islands
  - The Society Islands
  - The Tuamotu Archipelago and the Pitcairn Islands
  - Easter Island and Salas y Gómez
  - The Marquesas Islands
- Northern Polynesia
  - The Hawaiian Islands
- Oceanic islands of the Eastern Pacific
  - The Revillagigedo Islands
  - Cocos Island and Malpelo Island
  - Clipperton Island
  - The Galápagos Islands
  - The Desventuradas Islands
  - The Juan Fernández Islands

== Geopolitics and Oceania grouping ==
Exclusive economic zones of Oceania and adjacent areas. Non-tropical islands in the extreme north Pacific, such as the Aleutian Islands, are excluded from the map.

The 2007 book Asia in the Pacific Islands: Replacing the West, by New Zealand Pacific scholar Ron Crocombe, considers the phrase Pacific Islands to politically encompass American Samoa, Australia, the Bonin Islands, the Cook Islands, Easter Island, East Timor, Federated States of Micronesia, Fiji, French Polynesia, the Galápagos Islands, Guam, Hawaii, the Kermadec Islands, Kiribati, Lord Howe Island, the Marshall Islands, Nauru, New Caledonia, New Zealand, Norfolk Island, Niue, the Northern Mariana Islands, Palau, Papua New Guinea, Pitcairn Islands, Samoa, the Solomon Islands, Tokelau, Tonga, Tuvalu, Vanuatu, the Torres Strait Islands, Wallis and Futuna, Western New Guinea and the United States Minor Outlying Islands (Baker Island, Howland Island, Jarvis Island, Midway Atoll, Palmyra Atoll and Wake Island). Crocombe noted that Easter Island, Lord Howe Island, Norfolk Island, the Galápagos Islands, the Kermadec Islands, the Pitcairn Islands and the Torres Strait Islands currently have no geopolitical connections to Asia, but that they could be of future strategic importance in the Asia-Pacific. Another definition given in the book for the term Pacific Islands is islands served by the Pacific Community, formerly known as the South Pacific Commission. It is a developmental organization whose members include Australia and the aforementioned islands which are not politically part of other countries. In his 1962 book War in the Pacific: Strategy and Command, American author Louis Morton places the insular landmasses of the Pacific under the label of the "Pacific World". He considers it to encompass areas that were involved in the Pacific Theater of World War II. These areas include the islands of Melanesia, Micronesia and Polynesia, as well as Australia, the Aleutian Islands, Indonesia, Japan, the Philippines, the Ryukyu Islands and Taiwan.

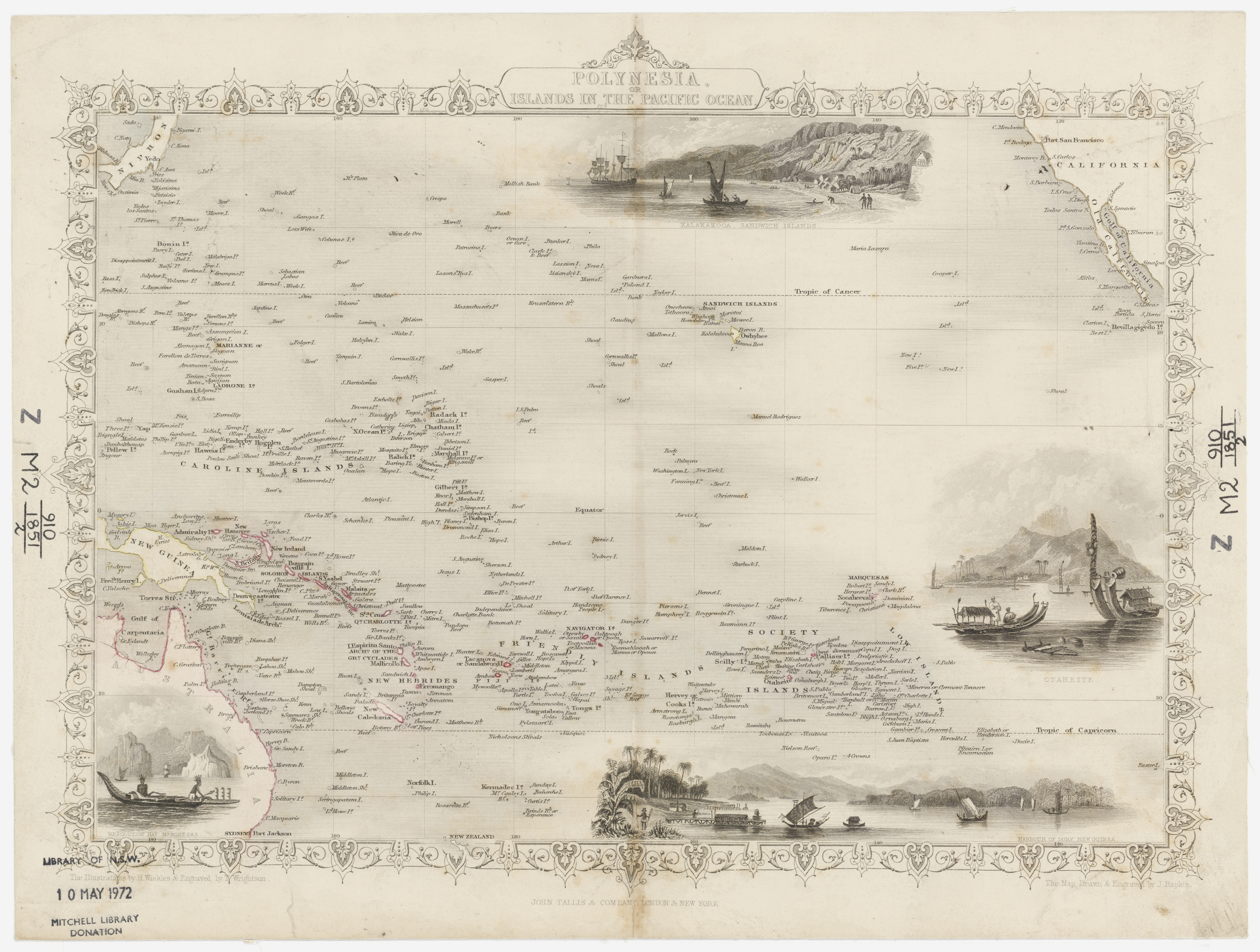
1851 map of Pacific listing colonial names of individual islands.

Since the beginning of the 19th century, Australia and the islands of the Pacific have been grouped by geographers into a region called Oceania. It is often used as a quasi-continent, with the Pacific Ocean being the defining characteristic. In some countries, such as Argentina, Brazil, China, Chile, Costa Rica, Ecuador, France, Greece, Italy, Mexico, the Netherlands, Peru, Spain, Switzerland or Venezuela, Oceania is seen as a proper continent in the sense that it is "one of the parts of the world". In his 1879 book Australasia, British naturalist Alfred Russel Wallace commented that, "Oceania is the word often used by continental geographers to describe the great world of islands we are now entering upon" and that "Australia forms its central and most important feature." 19th century definitions encompassed the region as beginning in the Malay Archipelago, and as ending near the Americas. In the 19th century, many geographers divided up Oceania into mostly racially-based subdivisions; Australasia, Malaysia (encompassing the Malay Archipelago), Melanesia, Micronesia and Polynesia. The 1995 book The Pacific Island States, by Australian author Stephen Henningham, claims that Oceania in its broadest sense "incorporates all the insular areas between the Americas and Asia." In its broadest possible usage, it could include Australia, the Melanesian, Micronesian and Polynesian islands, the Japanese and Malay Archipelagos, Taiwan, the Ryukyu and Kuril Islands, the Aleutian Islands and isolated islands off Latin America such as the Juan Fernández Islands. Islands with geological and historical ties to the Asian mainland (such as those in the Malay Archipelago) are rarely included in present definitions of Oceania, nor are non-tropical islands to the north of Hawaii. The 2004 book The Making of Anthropology: The Semiotics of Self and Other in the Western Tradition, by Jacob Pandian and Susan Parman, states that "some exclude from Oceania the nontropical islands such as Ryukyu, the Aleutian islands and Japan, and the islands such as Formosa, Indonesia and the Philippines that are closely linked with mainland Asia. Others include Indonesia and the Philippines with the heartland of Oceania."

Certain anthropological definitions restrict Oceania even further to only include islands which are culturally within Melanesia, Micronesia and Polynesia. Conversely, Encyclopedia Britannica believe that the term Pacific Islands is much more synonymous with Melanesia, Micronesia and Polynesia, and that Oceania, in its broadest sense, embraces all the areas of the Pacific which do not fall within Melanesia, Micronesia and Polynesia. The World Factbook and the United Nations categorize Oceania/the Pacific area as one of the seven major continental divisions of the world, and the two organizations consider it to politically encompass American Samoa, Australia, Christmas Island, Cocos (Keeling) Islands, the Cook Islands, Federated States of Micronesia, French Polynesia, Fiji, Guam, Kiribati, the Marshall Islands, Nauru, New Caledonia, New Zealand, Niue, Norfolk Island, the Northern Mariana Islands, Palau, Papua New Guinea, Pitcairn Islands, Samoa, the Solomon Islands, Tokelau, Tonga, Tuvalu, Vanuatu, Wallis and Futuna and the United States Minor Outlying Islands.

Since the 1950s, many (particularly in English-speaking countries) have viewed Australia as a continent-sized landmass, although they are still sometimes viewed as a Pacific Island, or as both a continent and a Pacific Island. Australia is a founding member of the Pacific Islands Forum, which is now recognized as the main governing body for the Oceania region. It functions as a trade bloc and deals with defense issues, unlike with the Pacific Community, which includes most of the same members. By 2021, the Pacific Islands Forum included all sovereign Pacific Island nations, such as Federated States of Micronesia, Fiji and Tonga, in addition to dependencies of other nations, such as American Samoa, French Polynesia and Guam. Islands which have been fully integrated into other nations, including Easter Island (Chile) and Hawaii (United States), have also shown interest in joining. Tony deBrum, Foreign Minister for the Marshall Islands, stated in 2014, "Not only is Australia our big brother down south, Australia is a member of the Pacific Islands Forum and Australia is a Pacific island, a big island, but a Pacific island." Japan and certain nations of the Malay Archipelago (including East Timor, Indonesia and the Philippines) have representation in the Pacific Islands Forum, but none are full members. The nations of the Malay Archipelago have their own regional governing organization called ASEAN, which includes mainland Southeast Asian nations such as Vietnam and Thailand. In July 2019, at the inaugural Indonesian Exposition held in Auckland, Indonesia launched its 'Pacific Elevation' program, which would encompass a new era of elevated engagement with the region, with the country also using the event to lay claim that Indonesia is culturally and ethnically linked to the Pacific islands. The event was attended by dignitaries from Australia, New Zealand and some Pacific island countries.

== List of the largest Pacific islands ==
Islands of the Pacific Ocean proper, with an area larger than 10,000 km^{2}.

Name	Area (km^{2})	Country/Countries	Population	Population density	Region	Subregion
New Guinea	785,753	Indonesia, Papua New Guinea	14,800,000	18.8	Oceania	Melanesia
Borneo	748,168	Indonesia, Malaysia, Brunei	23,053,723	30.8	Asia	Southeast Asia
Honshu	227,960	Japan	103,000,000	451.8	Asia	East Asia
Sulawesi	174,600	Indonesia	18,455,000	105.7	Asia	Southeast Asia
South Island	150,437	New Zealand	1,201,300	7.5	Oceania	Australasia / Polynesia
North Island	113,729	New Zealand	4,749,200	33.0	Oceania	Australasia / Polynesia
Luzon	109,965	Philippines	48,520,000	441.2	Asia	Southeast Asia
Mindanao	104,530	Philippines	25,281,000	241.9	Asia	Southeast Asia
Hokkaido	77,981	Japan	5,474,000	70.2	Asia	East Asia
Sakhalin	72,493	Russia	580,000	8.0	Asia	North Asia
Tasmania	64,519	Australia	514,700	5.7	Oceania	Australasia
Taiwan Island (Formosa)	35,883	Taiwan	23,000,000	641.0	Asia	East Asia
Kyushu	35,640	Japan	13,231,000	371.2	Asia	East Asia
New Britain	35,145	Papua New Guinea	513,926	14.6	Oceania	Melanesia
Hainan Island	33,210	China	8,180,000	246.3	Asia	East Asia
Vancouver Island	31,285	Canada	759,366	24.2	North America	Northern America
Shikoku	18,800	Japan	4,141,955	220.3	Asia	East Asia
Grande Terre	16,648	New Caledonia (France)	208,709	12.5	Oceania	Melanesia
Palawan	12,189	Philippines	430,000	35.3	Asia	Southeast Asia
Hawaii	10,434	United States of America	185,079	17.7	Oceania	Polynesia
Viti Levu	10,388	Fiji	600,000	57.0	Oceania	Melanesia

== By continent ==
=== Antarctica ===
- List of Antarctic and subantarctic islands

=== Asia ===
- List of islands of Asia
  - List of islands of China
  - Japanese archipelago of 6,852 islands
    - List of islands of Japan
  - List of islands of Indonesia
  - List of islands of North Korea
  - List of islands of the Philippines
  - List of islands of Russia
  - List of islands of South Korea
  - List of islands of Vietnam

=== North America ===
- Central American Pacific Islands
- List of islands of North America
  - List of islands of Canada, section British Columbia
  - List of islands of Mexico
  - List of islands of the United States

=== Oceania ===
- List of islands of Australia
- List of islands of Britain
  - List of islands of the Pitcairn Islands
- List of islands of Fiji
- List of islands of France, section Pacific Ocean
- List of islands of Hawaii
- List of islands of Kiribati
- List of islands of the Marshall Islands
- List of islands of New Zealand
- List of islands of Papua New Guinea
- List of islands of the Solomon Islands
- List of islands of Tonga
- List of islands of Tuvalu
- List of islands of the United States, section Insular areas
- List of islands of Vanuatu

=== South America ===
- List of islands of South America
  - List of islands of Chile
  - List of islands of Colombia
  - List of islands of Ecuador
  - List of islands of Peru

== By country ==
=== American Samoa ===
- American Samoa
  - Aunuu
  - Ofu-Olosega
  - Rose Atoll
  - Swains Island (Olosenga, Olohega) (Disputed)
  - Tau
  - Tutuila

=== Australia ===
- List of islands of Australia, including:
  - Coral Sea Islands
    - Willis Island
  - Lord Howe Island
  - Norfolk Island
  - Torres Strait Islands

=== Brunei ===
- List of islands of Brunei

=== Canada ===
- List of islands of British Columbia, many islands including:
  - Haida Gwaii, some 400 islands near Alaska
    - Graham Island, the main northern island
    - Moresby Island, the main southern island
  - Vancouver Island, Canada's largest Pacific island
    - Gulf Islands, numerous islands off the southeast coast of V.I. near the U.S. San Juan Islands

=== Chile ===
- Chiloé Island
- Desventuradas Islands
- Easter Island/Rapa Nui
- Isla Salas y Gómez
- Juan Fernández Islands

=== China ===
- List of islands of China

=== Colombia ===
- Gorgona Island
- Malpelo Island

=== Cook Islands ===
- Aitutaki
- Atiu
- Pamati (Palmerston)
- Mangaia
- Manihiki (Humphrey)
- Manuae (Hervey)
- Mauke (Parry)
- Mitiaro (Nukuroa)
- Nassau
- Pukapuka (Danger)
- Rakahanga (Reirson)
- Rarotonga
- Suwarrow (Anchorage)
- Takutea
- Tongareva (Penrhyn)

=== Costa Rica ===
- Cocos Island

=== Ecuador ===
- Galapagos Islands
- Puná Island

=== Fiji ===
- Principal islands:
  - Viti Levu
  - Vanua Levu
- Significant outliers:
  - Conway Reef
  - Kadavu Island
  - Taveuni
  - Rotuma Island
- Archipelagos:
  - Kadavu Group
  - Lau Islands
  - Lomaiviti Islands
  - Mamanuca Islands
  - Moala Islands
  - Ringgold Isles
  - Rotuma Group
  - Vanua Levu Group
  - Viti Levu Group
  - Yasawa Islands

=== France ===
- Clipperton Island

=== French Polynesia ===
- French Polynesia (Autonomous Overseas Territory of France)
  - Austral Islands
    - Tubuai
  - Society Islands
    - Windward Islands
      - Moorea
      - Tahiti
      - Tetiaroa
      - Maiao
      - Mehetia
    - Leeward Islands
      - Bora Bora
      - Huahine
      - Maupiti
      - Raiatea and Tahaa
      - Tupai
      - Mopelia (Maupihaa)
      - Manuae (Scilly Atoll)
      - Motu One (Bellinghausen)
  - Marquesas
    - Fatu Hiva
    - Hiva Oa
    - Euba
    - Nuku Hiva
    - Tahuata
    - Ua Huka Pen
    - Ua Pou
  - Tuamotus
    - Rangiroa
    - Fakarava
    - Moruroa
    - Fangataufa
  - Gambier Islands
    - Mangareva
    - Helena Island

=== Guam ===
- Guam
- Cocos Island

=== Hong Kong ===
- List of islands of Hong Kong
  - Hong Kong Island
  - Lantau

=== Indonesia ===
- Western New Guinea
- Borneo
- Natuna Islands

=== Japan ===
- List of islands of Japan, including:
- The five main islands:
  - Hokkaido - the northernmost and second largest main island.
  - Honshu - the largest and most populous island; home of the capital Tokyo.
  - Kyushu - the third largest main island and closest to the Asian continent.
  - Shikoku - the second smallest main island after Okinawa; between Honshu and Kyushu
  - Okinawa Island - the smallest and southernmost of the main islands
- Other notable islands:
  - Minamitorishima
  - Okinotori Islands

=== Kiribati ===
- List of islands of Kiribati:
  - Caroline Island
  - Flint Island
  - Gilbert Islands
  - Line Islands (8 of 11)
    - Kiritimati/Christmas Island
  - Malden Island
  - Phoenix Islands
  - Starbuck Island
  - Tabuaeran/Fanning Island
  - Teraina/Washington Island
  - Vostok Island

=== Macau ===
- List of islands of Macau

=== Malaysia ===
- Sipadan

=== Marshall Islands ===
- Marshall Islands
  - Bikini
  - Enewetak
  - Kwajalein
  - Rongelap
  - Majuro

=== Mexico ===
- Cedros Island
- Tiburón Island
- Revillagigedo Islands
- Rocas Alijos
- Guadalupe Island

=== Micronesia ===
Islands of Federated States of Micronesia

- Caroline Islands
- Pohnpei
- Yap
  - Ulithi
- Chuuk
  - Puluwat
- Kosrae

=== Nauru ===
- Nauru, a country and single island

=== New Caledonia ===
- New Caledonia (special collectivity of France)
  - Grande Terre (New Caledonia)
  - Chesterfield Islands
  - Ilots du Mouillage
    - Isle of Pines
    - Belep Islands
    - New Caledonia
  - Loyalty Islands
    - Bagao
    - Lifou Island
    - Maré Island
    - Ouvéa Island
    - Tiga Island
  - Matthew Island and Hunter Island, administered by France as part of New Caledonia but also claimed by Vanuatu

=== New Zealand ===
- Islands of New Zealand, around 600 islands including:
  - Auckland Islands
  - Chatham Islands
    - Chatham Island
    - Pitt Island
  - d'Urville Island
  - Great Barrier Island
  - Kapiti Island
  - Kermadec Islands
    - Macauley Island
    - Raoul Island
  - North Island
  - South Island
  - Stewart Island / Rakiura
  - Waiheke Island

=== Niue ===
- Niue, a country and single island

=== Northern Mariana Islands ===
- Northern Mariana Islands
  - Saipan
  - Rota
  - Tinian
  - Maug
  - Pagan Island
  - Alamagan
  - Farallon de Pajaros

=== Palau ===
Palau has over 250 islands, including:

- Angaur
- Babeldaob
- Caroline Islands
- Kayangel
- Ngerekebesang Island
- Oreor
- Peleliu
- Southwest Islands

=== Panama ===
- Pearl Islands

=== Papua New Guinea ===
- List of islands of Papua New Guinea
  - New Guinea, eastern half
  - Bismarck Archipelago
    - Admiralty Islands
      - Manus Island
    - Karkar Island
    - New Britain
    - New Ireland
    - Saint Matthias Group
  - Solomon Islands archipelago (northern part)
    - Bougainville
    - Buka Island
  - Trobriand Islands
    - Kiriwina
  - Woodlark Island
  - D'Entrecasteaux Islands
    - Fergusson Island
    - Goodenough Island
    - Normanby Island (Papua New Guinea)
  - Louisiade Archipelago
    - Misima Island
    - Tagula Island or Sudest Island
    - Rossel Island
    - Samarai
  - Daru Island
  - Kiwai Island

=== Philippines ===
- List of islands of the Philippines, over 7600 islands including:
  - Spratly Islands (disputed)
  - Scarborough Shoal (disputed)

=== Pitcairn Islands ===
- Pitcairn Islands, four islands:
  - Pitcairn Island
  - Henderson Island
  - Oeno Island
  - Ducie Island

=== Russia ===
- List of islands of Russia
  - Kuril Islands
  - Sakhalin

=== Samoa ===
- List of islands of Samoa:
  - Samoa (western part of the Samoa Islands)
    - Savai'i
    - Upolu
    - Apolima
    - Manono
    - Nuutele

=== Singapore ===
- Pedra Branca

=== Solomon Islands ===
- Islands of the Solomon Islands
  - Bellona
  - Choiseul
  - Florida Island
  - Guadalcanal
  - Malaita
  - Maramasike
  - New Georgia Islands
  - Rennell
  - Russell Islands
  - San Cristobal
  - Santa Cruz Islands
  - Santa Isabel
  - Shortland Islands
  - Sikaiana (Stewart Islands)
  - Tulagi
  - Ulawa
  - Uki

=== Taiwan ===
- List of islands of Taiwan, 166 islands including:
  - Taiwan, the main island with over 99% of the country's total area

=== Tokelau ===
- List of islands of Tokelau
  - Tokelau (mostly autonomous), three coral atolls with about 25 islands combined, including:
    - Olohega (Swains Island), administered by the United States as part of American Samoa, but claimed by Tokelau due to geography, history and language

=== Tonga ===
- List of islands in Tonga; in north to south order:
  - Niuafoou
  - Niuatoputapu (Keppel's Island)
  - Vavau
  - Kao
  - Tofua
  - Haapai
  - Tongatapu
  - Eua

=== Tuvalu ===
- Islands of Tuvalu
  - Funafuti (atoll of at least 30 islands)
  - Nanumanga (or Nanumaga)
  - Nanumea (atoll of at least 6 islands)
  - Niulakita
  - Niutao
  - Nui (atoll of at least 21 islands)
  - Nukufetau (atoll of at least 33 islands)
  - Nukulaelae (atoll of at least 15 islands)
  - Vaitupu (atoll of at least 9 islands)

=== United States ===
- Alaska, many islands including:
  - Aleutian Islands
  - Alexander Archipelago
  - Nunivak Island
  - St. Lawrence Island
- List of islands of California
  - Channel Islands
- Hawaiian Islands, many islands and islets including:
  - Hawaiʻi
  - Kahoʻolawe
  - Kauaʻi
  - Kaʻula
  - Lānaʻi
  - Maui
  - Molokaʻi
  - Niʻihau
  - Oʻahu
  - Northwestern Hawaiian Islands
    - Kure
    - Nīhoa
    - Necker
    - French Frigate Shoals
    - Gardner Pinnacles
    - Maro Reef
    - Laysan
    - Lisianski
    - Pearl and Hermes Reef
- List of islands of Oregon
  - Oregon Islands National Wildlife Refuge
- United States Minor Outlying Islands, eight small island groups between Hawaii and the Philippines (e.g. Johnston Atoll, Midway Atoll, Wake Atoll)
- List of islands of Washington state
  - Islands of Puget Sound
  - San Juan Islands

=== Vanuatu ===
- List of islands of Vanuatu, some 83 islands including (north to south approximately):
  - Torres Islands
  - Banks Islands
  - Espiritu Santo
  - Malakula
  - Ambrym
  - Paama
  - Epi
  - Shepherd Islands
  - Efate, home of the national capital Port Vila
  - Lelepa
  - Erromango
  - Tanna
- Disputed:
  - Matthew Island and Hunter Island, administered by France as part of New Caledonia but also claimed by Vanuatu

=== Wallis and Futuna ===
- Wallis and Futuna
  - Alofi
  - Futuna
  - Wallis (Uvea)
