= Cyclone Wasa–Arthur =

South Pacific cyclone in 1991

Severe Tropical Cyclone Wasa–Arthur
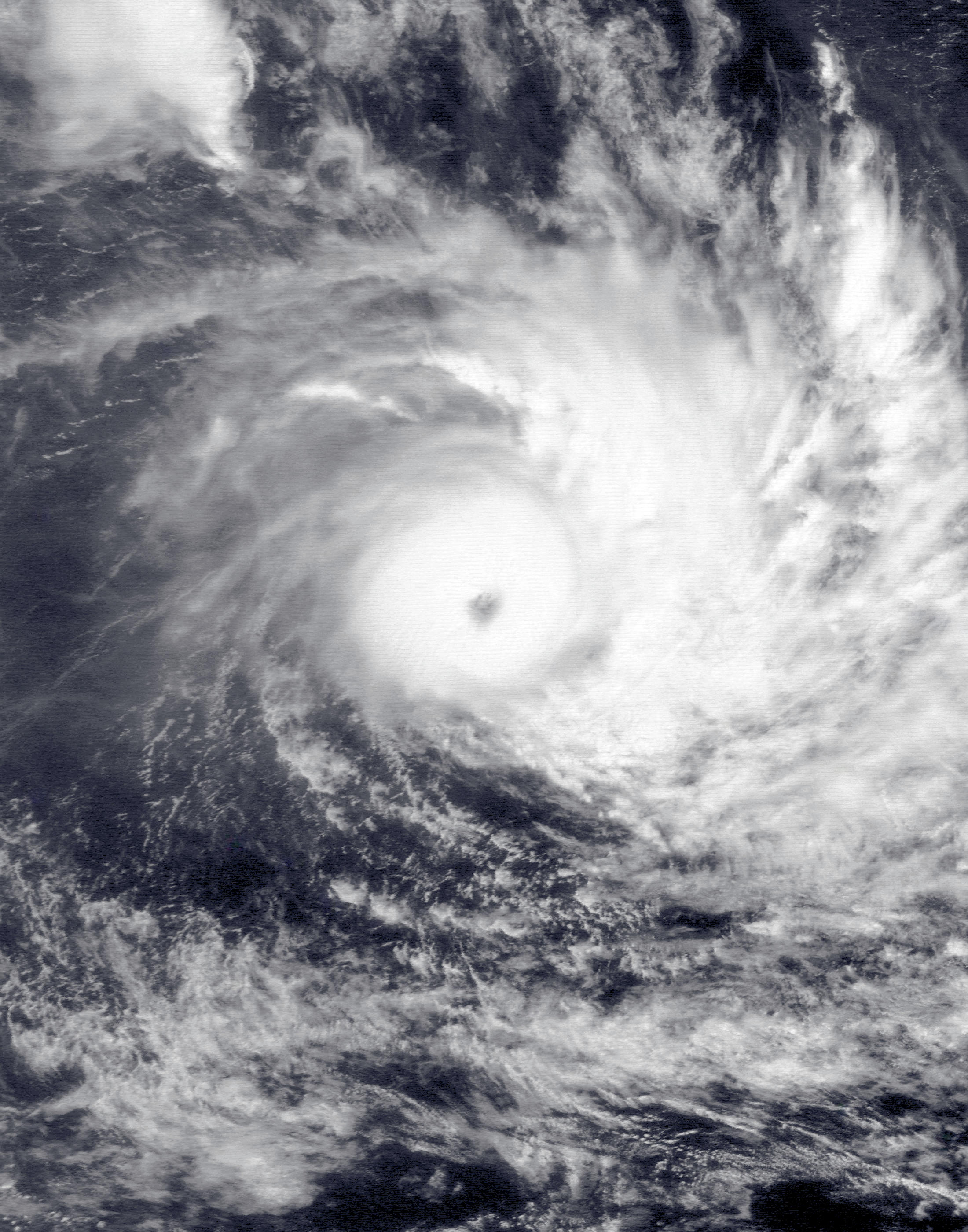
- Cyclone Wasa near French Polynesia at peak intensity on 9 December

Meteorological history
- Formed: 3 December 1991
- Dissipated: 18 December 1991

Category 4 severe tropical cyclone
- 10-minute sustained (FMS)
- Highest winds: 165 km/h (105 mph)
- Lowest pressure: 940 hPa (mbar); 27.76 inHg

Category 3-equivalent tropical cyclone
- 1-minute sustained (SSHWS/NPMOC)
- Highest winds: 195 km/h (120 mph)
- Lowest pressure: 938 hPa (mbar); 27.70 inHg

Overall effects
- Fatalities: 2 total
- Damage: $60 million (1991 USD)
- Areas affected: French Polynesia
- IBTrACS
- Part of the 1991–92 South Pacific cyclone season

Severe Tropical Cyclone Wasa–Arthur was the first major tropical cyclone to affect French Polynesia, including Tahiti, since the 1982–83 South Pacific cyclone season. The system was first noted on 3 December 1991 as a shallow tropical depression embedded within the monsoon trough, to the north of Rarotonga. Over the next couple of days the system gradually developed further, before it was classified as a tropical cyclone and named Wasa on 5 December. The following day, as it performed a small clockwise loop, the system strengthened further and acquired hurricane-force winds. After completing the loop, Wasa moved southwards before it peaked in intensity during 8 December, with sustained wind speeds of 165 km/h (105 mph). Over the next few days the system started to weaken as it passed through the Society Islands, and became the first major tropical cyclone to affect French Polynesia since 1983.

During 12 December, Wasa passed through the French Polynesian Austral Islands and passed directly over Tubuai, before it degenerated into a tropical depression later that day. However, gale-force winds remained associated with the depression, before the system turned towards the east-northeast and entered into warmer waters near the Tuamotu Islands. On 14 December, Wasa regenerated into a tropical depression and was renamed Arthur. During that day, the system gradually intensified before it reached its secondary peak intensity with sustained wind speeds of 95 km/h (60 mph). The following day, the system maintained its peak intensity, as it moved through the uninhabited Acteon Group, before it started gradually weaken the next day. Arthur degenerated into a shallow depression during 17 December, before it was last noted during the next day as it dissipated to the north of the Pitcairn Islands.

Tourists on Bora Bora were evacuated to a local church, after Wasa–Arthur had swept high seas into tourist bungalows. Overall the system caused an estimated US$60 million in damage within French Polynesia, with the majority of the damage done between 9 and 12 December. The cyclone destroyed and damaged several homes; a variety of crops; and damaged several public buildings, hotels, roads and power installations. On Rurutu, Moerai's harbour was destroyed by a cyclonic swell from the system, while the local school and police station were destroyed by high waves. Two people were killed when torrential rainfall from the cyclone caused a mudslide in Moorea, the day after Wasa had made its closest approach to the island. The Government of France incurred costs of about FF68 million including FF53 million for the efforts of the French military. The Government of French Polynesia subsequently borrowed FF55 million and built up a fund from local banks of about FF1.5 billion, to help with the reconstruction. The name Wasa was later retired from the South Pacific basin's lists of tropical cyclone names by the World Meteorological Organization.

== Meteorological history ==
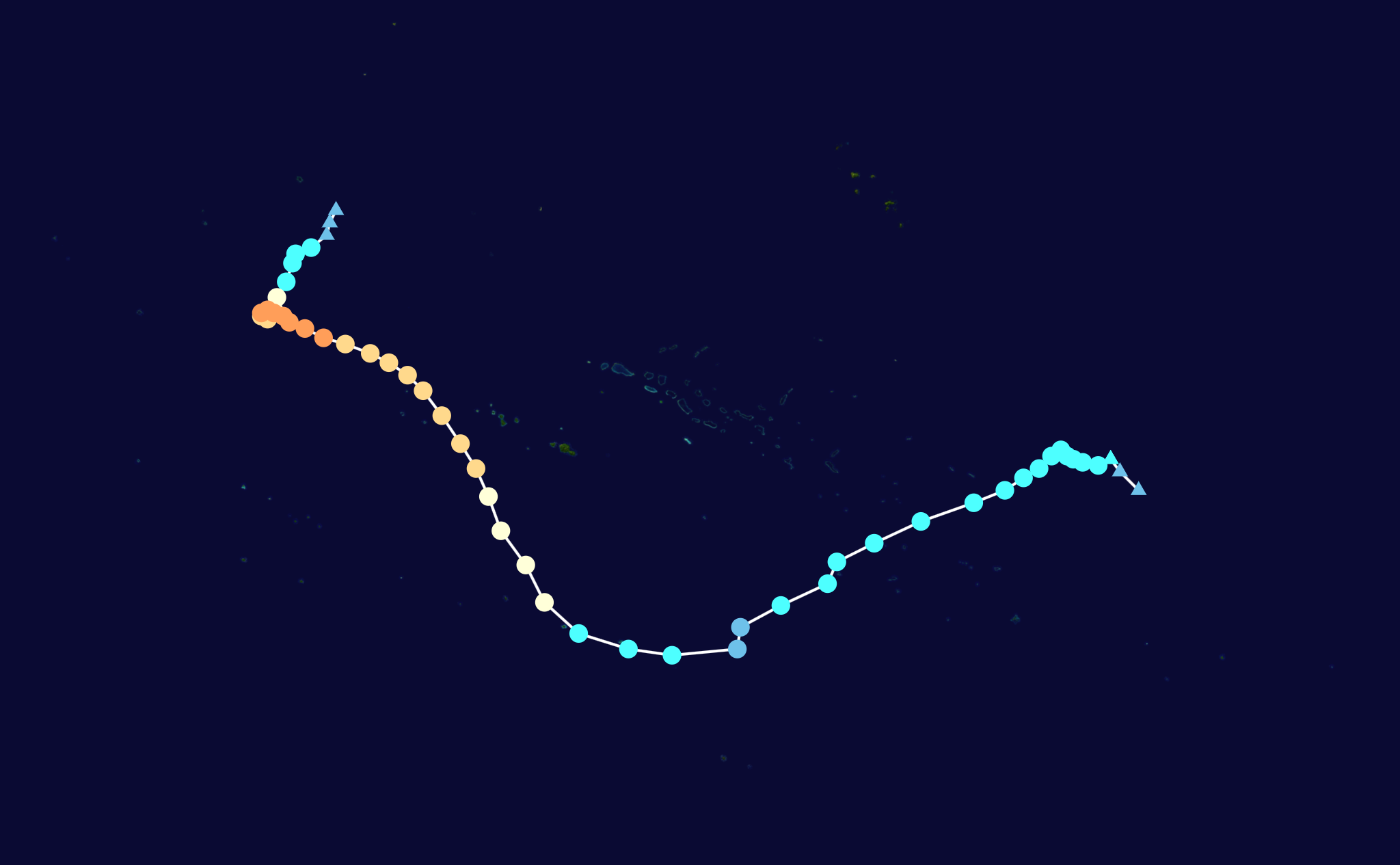
Map plotting the storm's track and intensity, according to the Saffir–Simpson scale Map key Saffir–Simpson scale Tropical depression (≤38 mph, ≤62 km/h) Tropical storm (39–73 mph, 63–118 km/h) Category 1 (74–95 mph, 119–153 km/h) Category 2 (96–110 mph, 154–177 km/h) Category 3 (111–129 mph, 178–208 km/h) Category 4 (130–156 mph, 209–251 km/h) Category 5 (≥157 mph, ≥252 km/h) Unknown Storm type Tropical cyclone Subtropical cyclone Extratropical cyclone, remnant low, tropical disturbance, or monsoon depression

On 3 December, the Fiji Meteorological Service (FMS) started to monitor a tropical depression, that was embedded within a monsoon trough of low pressure over the Northern Cook Islands. Over the next couple of days, the system gradually developed further as it moved south-westwards, before the United States Naval Western Oceanography Center (NWOC) initiated advisories on the system and designated it as Tropical Cyclone 07P during 5 December. This was followed by the FMS who reported that the depression had developed into a Category 1 tropical cyclone on the Australian tropical cyclone intensity scale and named it Wasa, while it was located about 250 km (155 mi) to the southwest of the Penhryn in the Northern Cook Islands. Over the next day, Wasa quickly intensified and made a small cyclonic loop, before it was classified as a Category 3 severe tropical cyclone during 7 December. On 8 December, Wasa started to move south-eastwards towards the Society Islands of French Polynesia, while the NWOC reported that Wasa had peaked in intensity with 1-minute sustained wind speeds of 195 km/h (120 mph), which made it equivalent to a category 3 hurricane on the Saffir-Simpson hurricane wind scale. This was followed by the FMS during the next day, who estimated that the system had peaked as a Category 4 severe tropical cyclone, with 10-minute sustained winds of 165 km/h (105 mph).

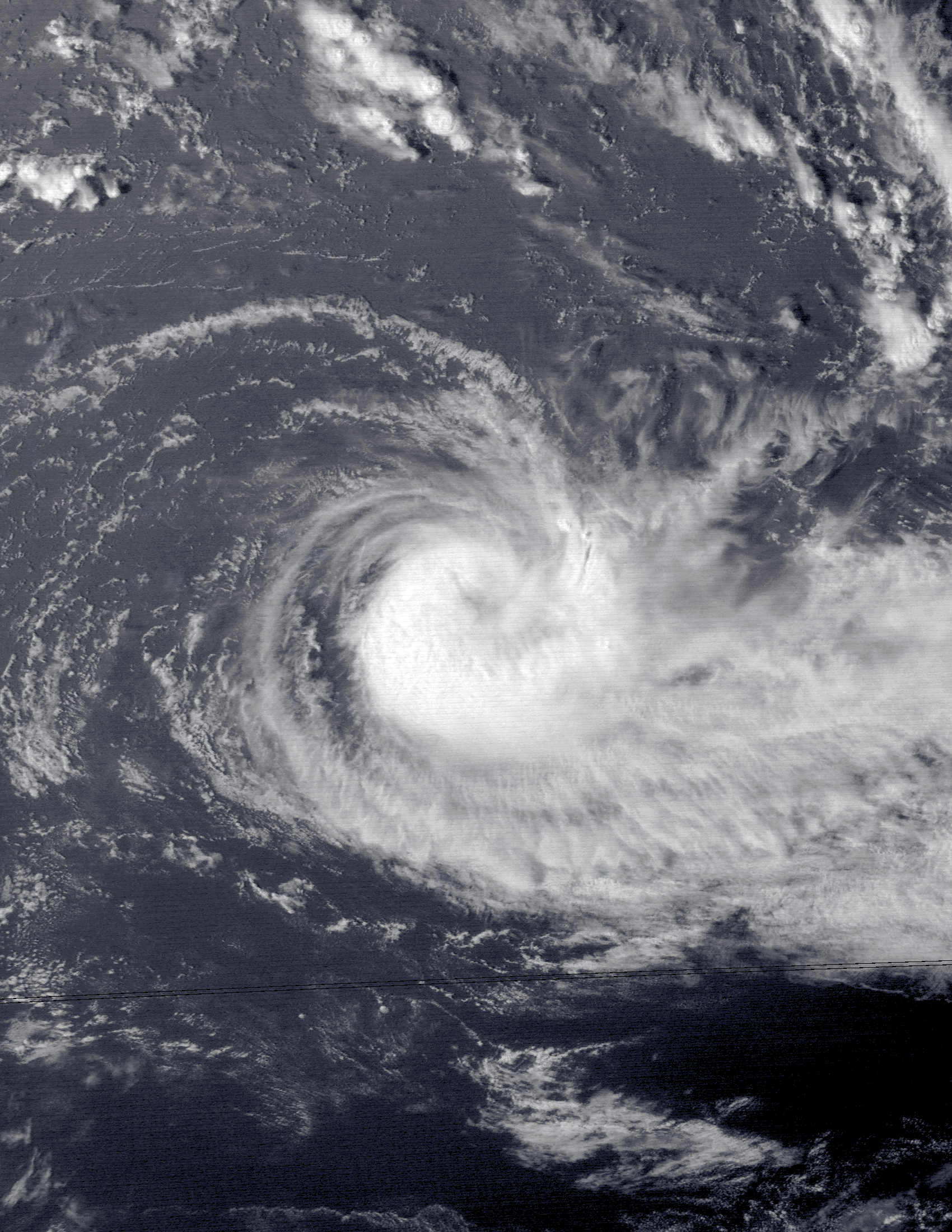
Cyclone Arthur at peak intensity on December 15

Wasa subsequently approached the Society Islands of Manuae and Motu One, before it passed within 60 km (35 mi) of Maupihaa and 125 km (80 mi) of Maupiti during 10 December. During the next day, the system started to weaken as it approached the Austral Islands and passed about 300 km (185 mi) to the southwest of Tahiti. The system subsequently continued to move south-eastwards and passed about 70 km (45 mi) to the northeast of Rurutu, before it directly passed over Tubuai on 12 December. After Wasa had passed over Tubuai, the FMS reported that Wasa had weakened below tropical cyclone strength and degenerated into a depression. Over the next day, gale-force winds persisted within the depression's southeastern quadrant, as it moved towards the east-northeast and into warmer waters near the Tuamotu Islands. By 13 December, the NWOC issued their final warning on the system, before the FMS reported during the next day that Wasa had regenerated into a tropical cyclone. However, for convenience, operational purposes, and to avoid any potential confusion among recipients of the warnings, the FMS decided to rename the system Arthur. During 14 December, Arthur passed about 150 km (90 mi) to the north-northwest of the atoll: Mururoa, while the FMS reported that winds associated with the system had increased to marginal storm force with winds of 95 km/h (60 mph). Over the next day, Arthur maintained its intensity as it moved north-eastwards through the northern islands of the Acteon Group, before the NWOC classified the system as Tropical Cyclone 08P during 15 December. Arthur subsequently started to gradually weaken as it turned eastwards, before the FMS and the NWOC reported that it had degenerated into a depression on 17 December. The system was last noted the next day, while it was located about 890 km (555 mi) to the southeast of Papeete in French Polynesia.

== Preparations and impact ==
Severe Tropical Cyclone Wasa–Arthur was the first major tropical cyclone to impact French Polynesia since the 1982–83 season. It impacted various parts of the island nation between 6 and 14 December, with the majority of the damage caused to the Society and Austral Islands during its first stage as a tropical cyclone. Overall Wasa–Arthur caused several minor injuries, two deaths and was considered to have caused extensive damage with damage totals estimated at US$60 million. Ahead of the system impacting the island nation, various watches and warnings were issued, including a red alert for Tahiti, which banned all road traffic and navigation around the islands. The system brought strong winds, flooding, heavy rain, high seas, swells and a storm surge to the island nation.

=== French Polynesia ===
On 12 December, tourists on the island of Bora Bora were evacuated to a local church, after the system had swept high seas into tourist bungalows. The system destroyed 367 homes, damaged 855 other homes, destroyed or damaged a variety of crops and damaged several public buildings, hotels, roads and power installations, with the worst affected islands were Bora Bora and Tubuai. On Rurutu island, Moerai harbour was destroyed by a cyclonic swell generated by the system, while the local school and police station were destroyed by high waves. A women and her child were killed while asleep, after torrential rainfall from Wasa caused a mudslide on the island of Moorea the day after the system had made its closest approach to the island.

Strong winds were recorded within the Leeward Islands, which destroyed hundreds of houses, devastated crops and uprooted trees. A swell of 6–8 m (20–26 ft) submerged the islands of Manuae, Motu One and Mopelia. On Mopelia atoll, the 66 inhabitants of the island attached themselves to poles to avoid being swept away by Wasa's high waves.

Wasa's eye went directly impacted the island of Tubuai during 12 December, where sustained winds of 100 km/h (60 mph), wind gusts of around 150 km/h (95 mph) and a minimum pressure of 976 hPa (28.82 inHg) were reported. Waves of between 10–15 metres (33–49 ft) were observed, while the sea had penetrated up to 100 metres (330 ft) inland. In Tubuai, the local school and police station were destroyed by high waves, which also damaged stretches of the coastal highway.

== Aftermath ==
During the aftermath of the cyclone, a French Military cargo plane and several helicopters carried out initial relief efforts to several of the islands affected by Wasa, before the French Polynesian Government and private cargo ships continued the effort, by carrying emergency relief supplies and reconstruction materials. The French Government's Minister for Overseas France: Louis Le Pensec arrived in Tahiti on 15 December, to inspect the damage and explore ways of rebuilding the island nation, after similar tours were conducted by the President of French Polynesia, Gaston Flosse and several of his cabinet ministers. During the emergency period, the French Government incurred costs of about FF68 million including FF53 million for the efforts of the French Military. The French Polynesian Government subsequently borrowed FF55 million from the Central Fund for Economic Cooperation and built up a fund from local banks of about FF1.5 billion, to help with the reconstruction of infrastructure and territorial buildings. The name Wasa was later retired, from the list of tropical cyclone names by the World Meteorological Organization.

== See also ==
- Tropical cyclones in 1991
