= Cyclone Martin (1997) =

South Pacific cyclone

Severe Tropical Cyclone Martin
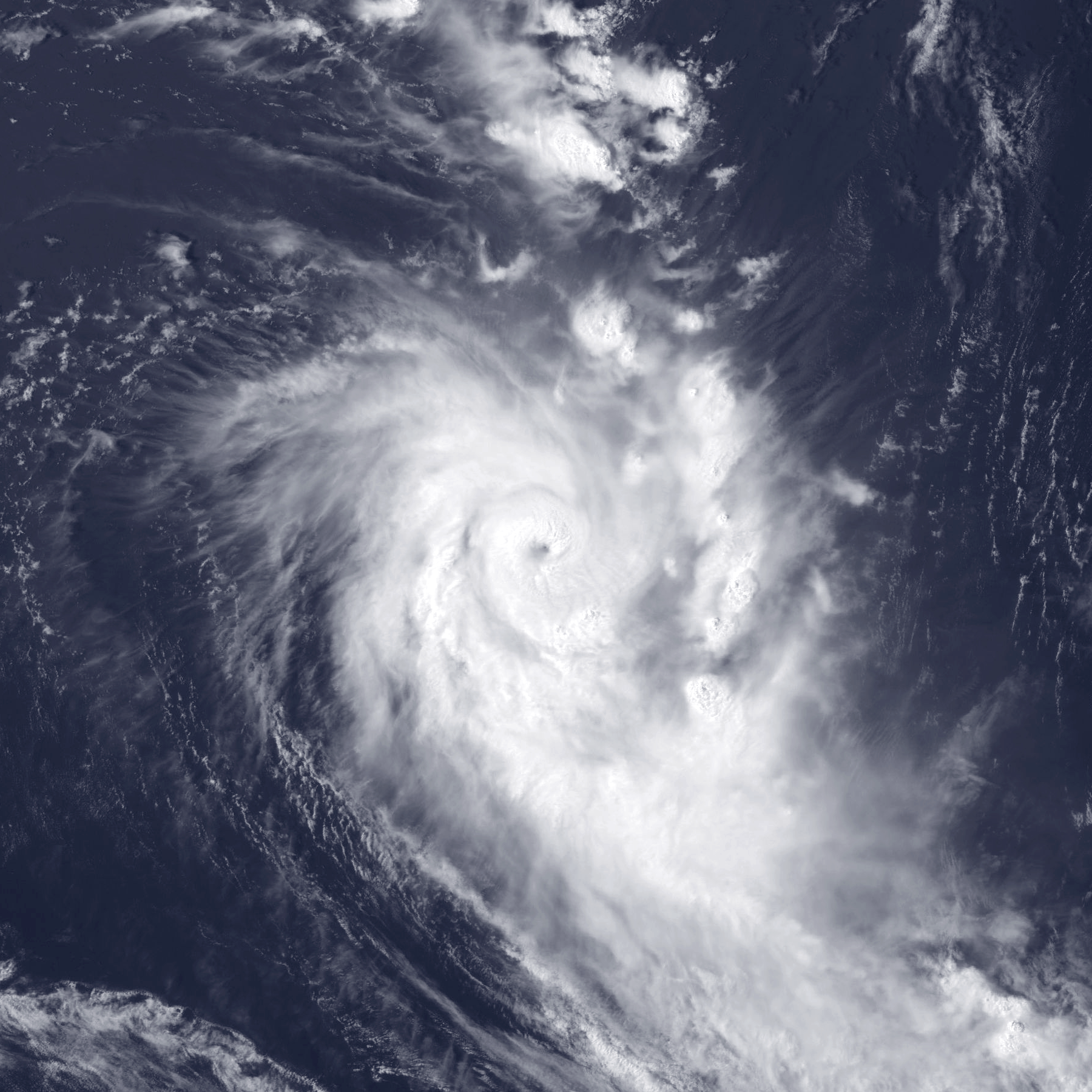
- Cyclone Martin near peak intensity south of Manahiki on November 3

Meteorological history
- Formed: October 27, 1997
- Dissipated: November 5, 1997

Category 3 severe tropical cyclone
- 10-minute sustained (FMS)
- Highest winds: 155 km/h (100 mph)
- Lowest pressure: 945 hPa (mbar); 27.91 inHg

Category 3-equivalent tropical cyclone
- 1-minute sustained (SSHWS/NPMOC)
- Highest winds: 185 km/h (115 mph)
- Lowest pressure: 944 hPa (mbar); 27.88 inHg

Overall effects
- Fatalities: 28
- Damage: $8 million (1997 USD)
- Areas affected: Cook Islands, French Polynesia
- IBTrACS
- Part of the 1997–98 South Pacific cyclone season

Severe Tropical Cyclone Martin was the deadliest tropical cyclone of the 1997–98 South Pacific cyclone season. The system was first noted as a weak tropical disturbance on October 27, to the north of the Northern Cook Islands. Over the next few days atmospheric convection surrounding the system remained disorganized, as it moved towards the southwest and was affected by strong upper-level north-easterly winds and moderate to strong vertical wind shear. The system was subsequently named Martin during October 31, after it had rapidly developed further and shown a marked improvement organization.

== Meteorological history ==
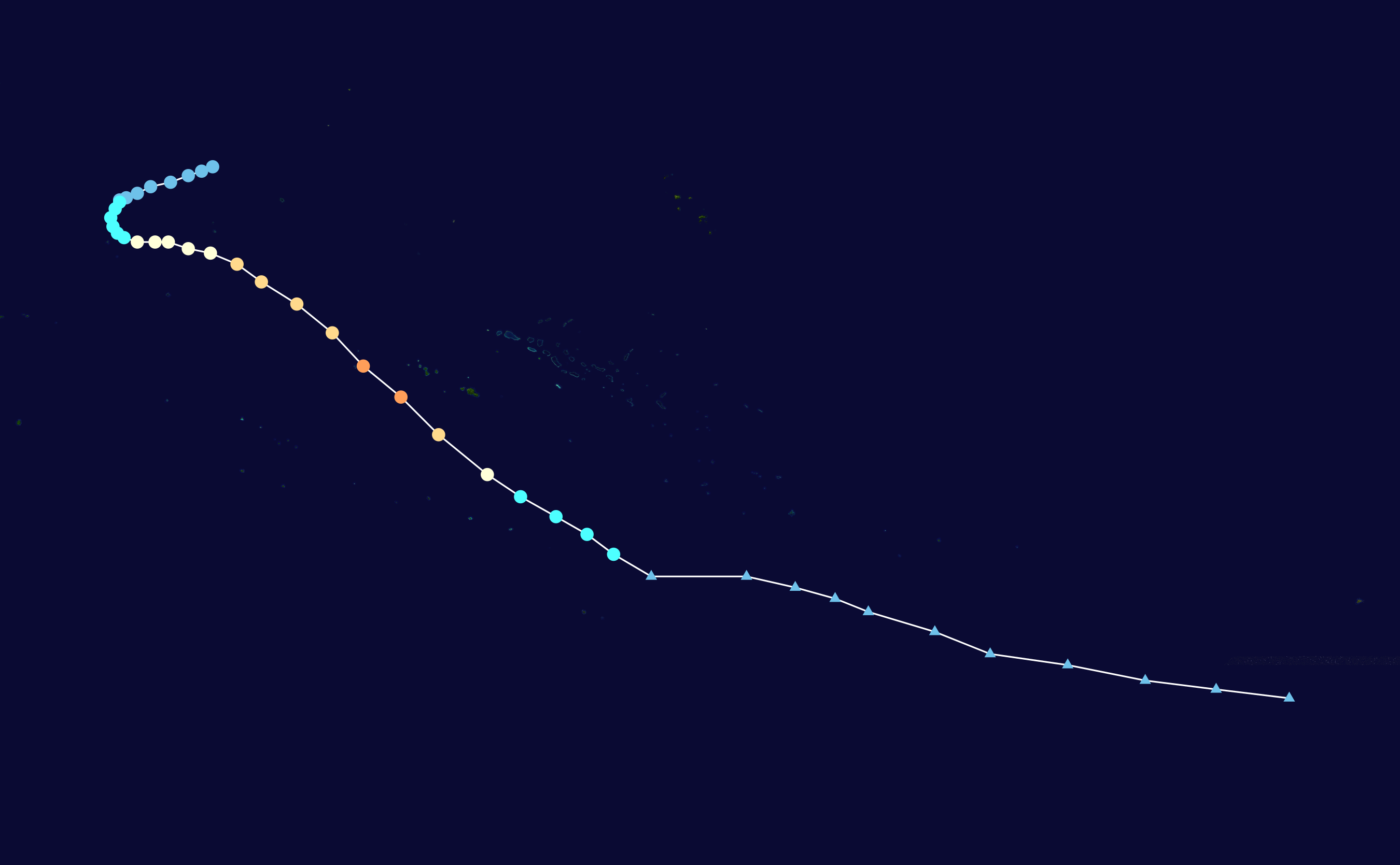
Map plotting the storm's track and intensity, according to the Saffir–Simpson scale Map key Saffir–Simpson scale Tropical depression (≤38 mph, ≤62 km/h) Tropical storm (39–73 mph, 63–118 km/h) Category 1 (74–95 mph, 119–153 km/h) Category 2 (96–110 mph, 154–177 km/h) Category 3 (111–129 mph, 178–208 km/h) Category 4 (130–156 mph, 209–251 km/h) Category 5 (≥157 mph, ≥252 km/h) Unknown Storm type Tropical cyclone Subtropical cyclone Extratropical cyclone, remnant low, tropical disturbance, or monsoon depression

On October 25, the area of low pressure that was to become Severe Tropical Cyclone Martin was first noted within a convergence zone in the vicinity of the Northern Cook Islands. Over the next few days, the system slowly moved south-westwards and was classified as a tropical disturbance by the Fiji Meteorological Service (FMS) on October 27. At the time, the FMS noted that the system was being impacted by strong upper-level north-easterly winds and had a weak low-level circulation, while atmospheric convection surrounding the disturbance was unorganised. Over the next two days, the system continued to slowly move south-westwards and showed only a slight improvement in its overall organisation as it was being impacted by moderate to strong levels of vertical wind shear. On October 30, the United States Naval Pacific Meteorology and Oceanography Center (NPMOC) initiated advisories on the system and designated it as Tropical Cyclone 04P. During the following day, the system started to recurve and move southwards, in response to strengthening westerly winds in the middle of the atmosphere. The disturbance also started to rapidly develop and show marked signs of improved organisation, which prompted the FMS to report that the system had developed into a Category 1 tropical cyclone on the Australian tropical cyclone intensity scale and name it Martin at around 15:00 UTC (05:00 Cook Islands Time). At the time, the system was located about 110 km (70 mi) to the northwest of Pukapuka, where sustained winds of 110 km/h (70 mph), wind gusts of 155 km/h (100 mph) and a barometric pressure of 997 hPa (29.44 inHg) were estimated to have occurred.

After it had been named, Martin continued to intensify and started to move south-eastwards, as it recurved in response to an intensifying mid-tropospheric westerly flow. Over the next couple of days, the system moved south-eastwards towards a weakness in the upper-level subtropical ridge of high pressure and intensified into a category 3 severe tropical cyclone with hurricane-force winds during November 1. During the following day, Martin passed about 150 km (95 mi) to the south of Manihiki in the Northern Cook Islands, before it developed a 17 km (11 mi) eye and moved towards French Polynesia. During November 3, as the system passed near Bellingshausen, Mopelia and Scilly, the FMS reported that Martin had peaked as a Category 3 severe tropical cyclone, with 10-minute sustained wind speeds of 155 km/h (100 mph). Later that day, the NPMOC reported that the system had peaked with 1-minute sustained winds of 185 km/h (115 mph), which made it equivalent to a category 3 hurricane on the Saffir-Simpson scale. Martin subsequently started to gradually weaken, as it started to interact with a frontal system and transition into an extratropical cyclone. The system then passed over 250 km (155 mi) to the south of Tahiti during November 4, before it weakened below tropical cyclone intensity during November 5. Martin was subsequently last noted during November 8, while it was located over 1,800 km (1,120 mi) to the southeast of Adamstown in the Pitcairn Islands.

== Impact ==
Martin caused significant damage and at least 28 deaths as it impacted the Northern Cook Islands and French Polynesia. Martin and its precursor tropical depression impacted the atolls of Pukapuka, Manihiki and Rakahanga, within the Northern Cook Islands between October 31 - November 2.

=== Cook Islands ===
On October 31, Pukapuka became the first atoll to be impacted by Martin, where winds were estimated at 110 km/h (70 mph) and a pressure of 997 hPa (29.44 inHg) was reported. On the island, damage was reported to the hospital, post office, doctors, and the homes of various government representatives. Authorities lost contact with the island at the height of the storm.

Almost every building on Manihiki was destroyed by the storm surge. 10 people were killed and 10 more were reported missing and later declared dead by the Cook Islands Coroner. 360 people were evacuated to Rarotonga, with most never returning. When the centre was closest to the island, the automatic weather station reported a lowest pressure of 994hPa, sustained winds of 20 m/s, and a highest gust of 29 m/s. However, this was the last meteorological report from the station before it was destroyed by storm surge. Within the Cook Islands, Martin was the deadliest known tropical cyclone to affect the Cook Islands in over a century, after it caused 19 deaths within the Islands.

=== French Polynesia ===
On Bellingshausen, Mopelia and Scilly, eight people were killed. Waves swept across the low lying island and destroyed its buildings, with the damage attributed mainly to wave action rather than strong winds.

== Aftermath ==
On November 2, after the Disaster Management Committee on Rarotonga received reports that the runway on Manihiki was intact, arrangements were made with Air Rarotonga for a plane to be sent to the atoll. The plane subsequently arrived in Manihiki with food and medical equipment, as well as a relief team consisting of two doctors, a communications technician, the Minister of Disaster Management: Tepure Tapaitau, as well as various other officials. The Cook Islands Government also formally requested assistance from the Government of New Zealand.

During November 3, the New Zealand Foreign Affairs Minister: Don McKinnon, received a request for Cook Islands Government. As a result, a Hercules from the Royal New Zealand Air Force would fly tarpaulins, water containers, blankets and communications equipment to Rarotonga, where food and medical supplies were added before it was dispatched to Manihiki.

The name Martin was later retired from the South Pacific naming lists.

== See also ==
- Cyclone Namu
- Cyclone Wasa–Arthur
- List of off-season South Pacific tropical cyclones
