= Manuae =

Manuae is the name of several islands in the South Pacific Ocean, including:

- Manuae (Cook Islands) in the Cook Islands
- Manuae (Society Islands) in French Polynesia
