= Euba =

Euba is a surname. Notable people with the surname include:

- Akin Euba (1935–2020), Nigerian composer, musicologist, and pianist
- Femi Euba (born 1942), Nigerian actor and dramatist
- Jon Mikel Euba (born 1967), Basque artist
- Wolf Euba (1934–2013), German reciter, actor, director and radio author
- Rafa Euba (born 1960), Basque author

== See also ==
- Chemnitz-Euba, part of Chemnitz, Germany
- Ekonomická univerzita v Bratislave, see University of Economics in Bratislava
- Pacific island, see Pacific island
