= Maupiti (commune) =

Commune in French Polynesia, France

- Commune
- Flag

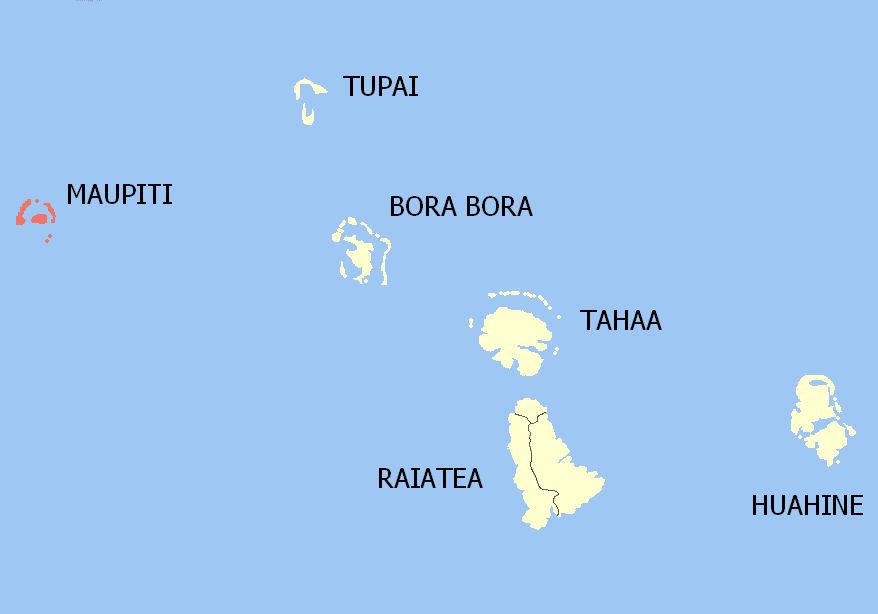
- Location of the commune (in red) within the Leeward Islands. The atolls of Maupiha'a (Mopelia), Manua'e (Scilly), and Motu One (Bellinghausen) lie outside of the map.
- Location of Maupiti
- Location within France
- Coordinates: 16°27′S 152°15′W
- Country: France
- Overseas collectivity: French Polynesia
- Subdivision: Leeward Islands

Government
  - Mayor (2020–2026): Woullingson Raufauore
- Area^{1}: 25.5 km^{2} (9.8 sq mi)
- Highest elevation: 380 m (1,250 ft)
- Lowest elevation: 0 m (0 ft)
- Population (2022): 1,302
  - Density: 51.1/km^{2} (132/sq mi)
- Time zone: UTC−10:00
- INSEE/Postal code: 98728 /98732
- ^{1} French Land Register data, which excludes lakes, ponds, glaciers > 1 km^{2} (0.386 sq mi or 247 acres) and river estuaries.

Maupiti is a commune of French Polynesia, an overseas territory of France in the Pacific Ocean. The commune is in the administrative subdivision of the Leeward Islands.

The commune of Maupiti is made up of the island of Maupiti proper with its surrounding islets emerging from the coral reef, with an area of 12.1 km^{2} in total, and of three distant atolls:

- Maupiha'a (a.k.a. Mopelia), 4.6 km^{2} in land area, located 185 km (115 mi) south-west of Maupiti
- Manua'e (a.k.a. Scilly), 4.9 km^{2} in land area, located 255 km (160 mi) west of Maupiti. This atoll is the westernmost emerged land of French Polynesia.
- Motu One (a.k.a. Bellinghausen), 3.97 km^{2} (0.9 sq mi) in land area, located 250 km (155 mi) north-west of Maupiti.

Most of the inhabitants live on Maupiti island itself. The atolls of Maupiha'a and Manua'e have 20 and 21 inhabitants respectively, while Motu One is uninhabited. At the 2022 census the commune had a population of 1,302.

The administrative center of the commune is the settlement of Vai'ea, on the island of Maupiti.
