= Bagao =

Island in Pacific belonging to New Caledonia

Coordinates: 20°37′S 166°17′E

Bagao is an island, which is also part of the Loyalty Islands, belonging to New Caledonia, an overseas territory of France in the Pacific Ocean.
