= Maupihaʻa =

Atoll in French Polynesia

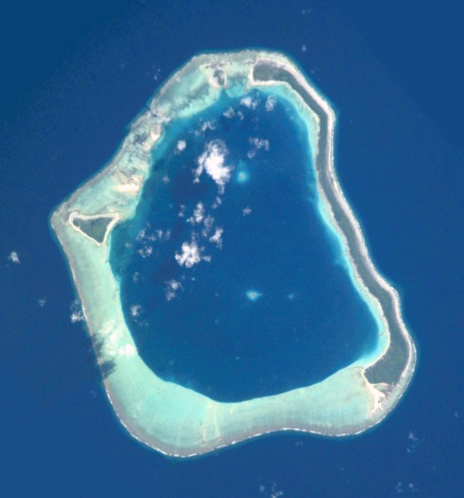
- NASA picture of the island of Maupihaʻa Atoll

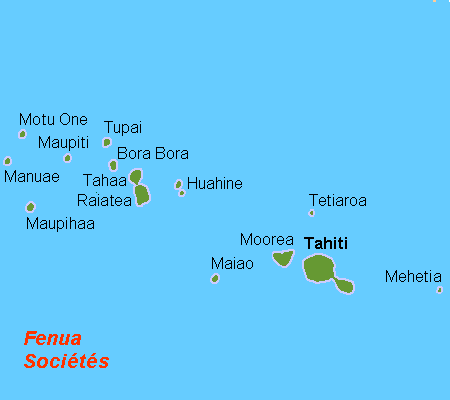

Geography
- Location: Pacific Ocean pito
- Coordinates: 16°48′S 153°57′W
- Archipelago: Society Islands
- Area: 2.6 km^{2} (1.0 sq mi)

Administration
- France
- Overseas collectivity: French Polynesia
- Administrative subdivision: Leeward Islands

Demographics
- Population: 20 (2017)
- Pop. density: 4/km^{2} (10/sq mi)

Maupihaʻa (Maupihaa), also known as Mopelia, is an atoll in the Leeward group (Iles sous le Vent) of the Society Islands, in the South Pacific. This atoll is located 72 km southeast of Manuaʻe, its nearest neighbor.

== Geography ==
Maupihaʻa atoll is roughly 8 km in length and contains a lagoon that is up to 40 m in depth and surrounded by submerged reefs on three sides. The atoll's outer reefs are continuous except for a small passage on the western side of the atoll. The eastern side consists of a narrow, thickly vegetated islet (Motu Maupihaʻa), and a number of smaller islets bring the total land area of Maupihaʻa to 2.6 km^{2}. The only village on the atoll is located on Motu Maupihaʻa; as of August 27, 2023, the population consisted of 7 people.

== History ==
Maupihaʻa Atoll was inhabited in very ancient times by Polynesians; archaeological remains and fish hooks have been found. The first European to arrive on Maupihaʻa, along with neighboring Fenua Ura and Motu One, was Samuel Wallis in 1767.

In 1917, the atoll was leased to a Papeete company, with three employees producing copra, and raising pigs and chickens and collecting turtles. It was later leased to another copra company and entirely planted with coconut palms.

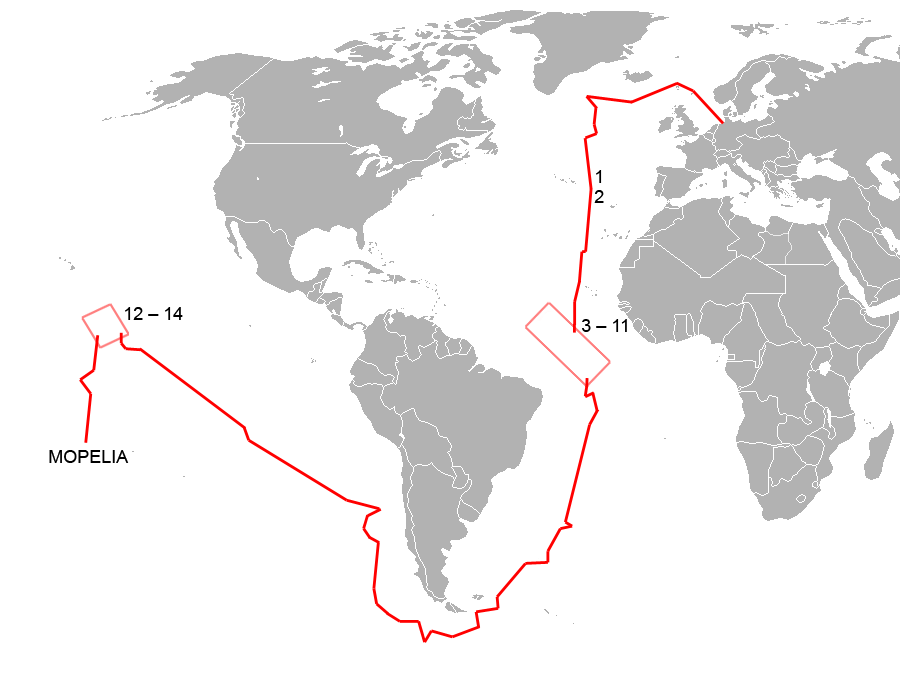
Route of SMS Seeadler

In the same year, Count Felix von Luckner of the famed SMS Seeadler visited the island during his voyage to raid Allied shipping in the South Pacific during the First World War. The purpose of the stop was to obtain provisions and to make repairs to the Seeadler's hull after traveling across the Pacific and around South America. After a short time, rough seas and wind caused the Seeadler to run aground on Mopelia's reef, leaving von Luckner and more than 100 others.

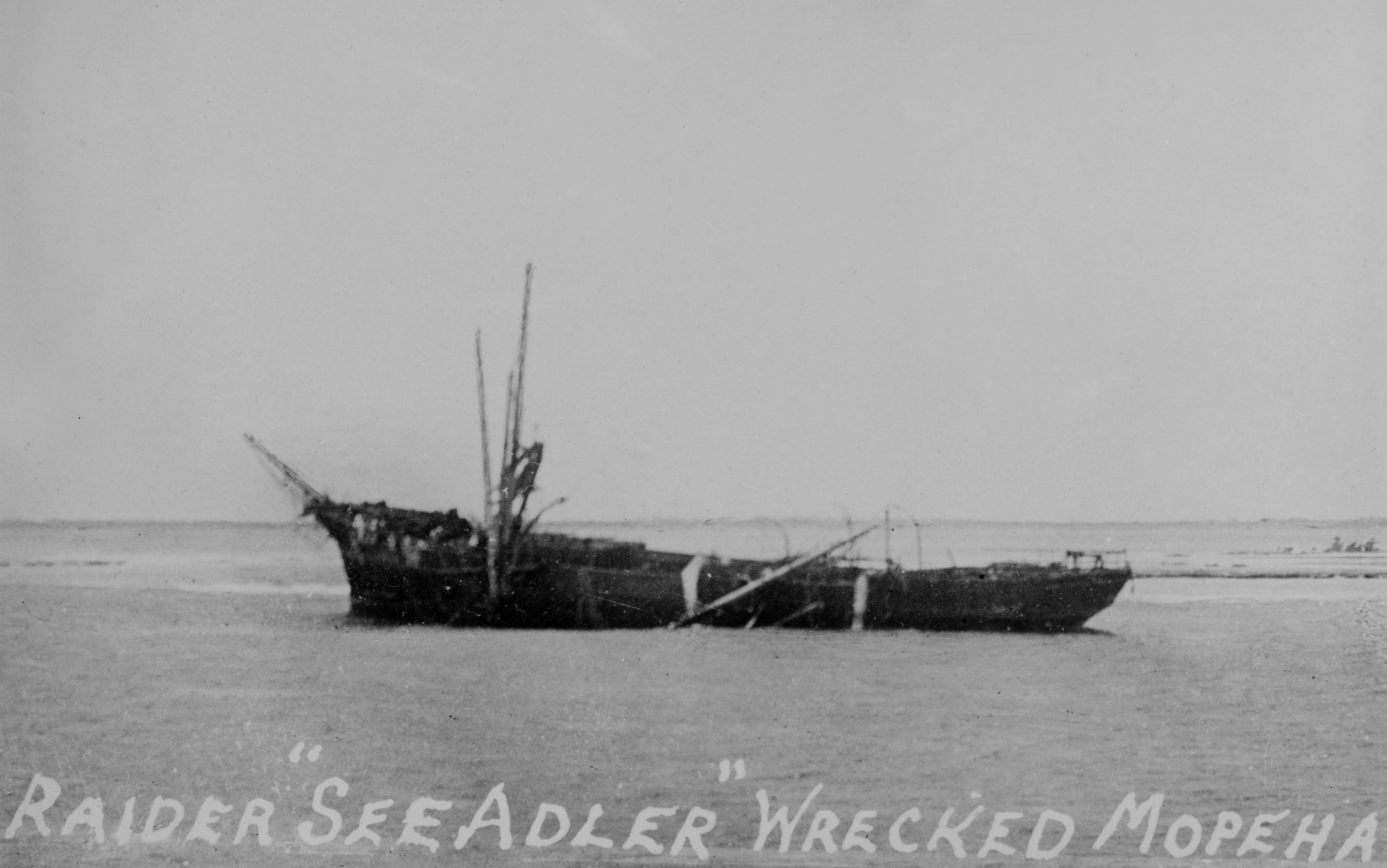
The wrecked Seeadler

At that time the island was inhabited by only three Polynesians, who collected coconuts for Tahiti and processed them into copra. The 64 crew members of the Seeadler and 47 prisoners — crews and passengers of the previously captured ships — lived with the Polynesians on Maupihaʻa for several months in what Luckner jokingly referred to as "Germany's last colony". The crew built the Seeadlerburg settlement from the remains of the stranded ship. They called the island Cäcilieninsel.

Some of the stranded sailors were American prisoners of war who were captured on the ocean by Luckner's raiders. Eventually von Luckner chose a few men and rigged a long boat with a sail to journey about 2,000 mi (3,200 km) to the Fiji Islands, where von Luckner intended to capture another sailing ship and go back and rescue the remaining seamen on Mopelia. However, the plan did not succeed, for while von Luckner was able to reach his destination, he ended up surrendering to a British lieutenant. Von Luckner spent the rest of World War I as a POW in New Zealand, though he successfully escaped on one occasion, absconding on the boat of the prison warden with several other prisoners, only to be recaptured.

Meanwhile, the rest of his crew captured a French schooner, Lutece, which called at Mopelia, sailed it to Easter Island arriving on 4 October and ran aground there, after which they were interned by the Chilean authorities. Four American seamen then sailed an open boat 1,000 mi (1,600 km) to Pago Pago, where they arranged for their colleagues' rescue from Mopelia.

The most recent supply ship visited in 2021. A sailing vessel named Russula arrived in August 2023 while on a wandering type of cruise across the Pacific. The crew donated clothes, tools, and much needed motor oil for the outboard motors of the islanders.

== Administration ==
The atoll is administratively part of the commune (municipality) of Maupiti, itself in the administrative subdivision of the Leeward Islands. Presently, Maupihaʻa is listed as permanently uninhabited.

== Alternate names ==
- Mopelia
- Maupelia
- Mopihaa
- Maupihoa
- Mapetia
- Cäcilieninsel

== See also ==
- Desert island
- List of islands
