= Society Islands =

Archipelago in French Polynesia

Native name: Îles de la Société (French); Tōtaiete mā (Tahitian)
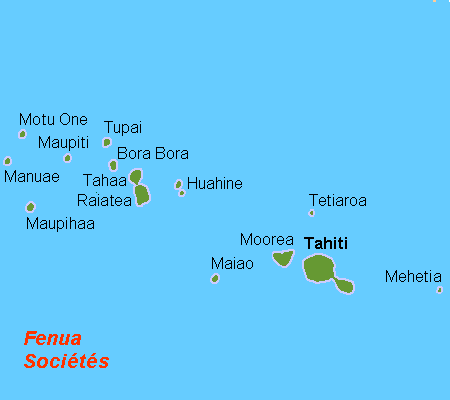

- Location within Pacific Ocean Location within French Polynesia

Geography
- Location: Pacific Ocean
- Coordinates: 16°51′S 151°24′W
- Archipelago: Polynesia
- Total islands: 14
- Major islands: Tahiti, Moorea, Raiatea, Bora Bora, Huahine
- Area: 1,590 km^{2} (610 sq mi)
- Highest elevation: 2,241 m (7352 ft)
- Highest point: Mont Orohena

Administration
- France
- Collectivity: French Polynesia
- Largest settlement: Faʼaʼā (pop. 29,828)

Demographics
- Population: 207,333 (2017)
- Pop. density: 148/km^{2} (383/sq mi)

The Society Islands (Note: French: Îles de la Société [il də la sɔsjete], officially Archipel de la Société [aʁʃipɛl də la sɔsjete]; Tahitian: Tōtaiete mā)) are an archipelago in Polynesia in the South Pacific Ocean. Politically, the islands are part of French Polynesia, a semi-autonomous part of France. The largest and most populous island is Tahiti. Other major islands are Moʻorea, Raʻiātea, Bora Bora and Huahine.

== Name ==
The term Society Islands was first used by Captain James Cook when he visited the Leeward Islands, a subgroup of six of the modern-day Society Islands, during his expedition to the south Pacific Ocean in 1769. It has been asserted that the name honors the Royal Society, the sponsor of his voyage, but this is disputed. Cook wrote in his journal:

To these six islands, [Raiatea, Tahaʻa, Bora Bora, Huahine, Tupai, and Maupiti], as they lie contiguous to each other, I gave the names of SOCIETY ISLANDS, but did not think it proper to distinguish them separately by any other names than those by which they were known to the natives.

== History ==
=== Settlement ===
The first Polynesians are understood to have arrived on these islands around 1000 AD.

=== Oral history origin ===
The islanders explain their origins in terms of an orally transmitted story. The feathered god Ta'aroa lay in his shell. He called out but no-one answered, so he went back into his shell, where he stayed for aeons. When he came out he changed his body into the multi-layered dome of the sky. Other parts of his body he transformed into Papa-fenua, the earth. Other parts he made into Te Tuma, the ata, or shadow of his phallus. Ta'aroa said, "Cast your eyes on my phallus. Gaze upon it and insert it in the earth." He came down to earth at "Opoa in Havai'i" (now Ra'iatea), one of the most sacred places in the Society Islands. Other gods were created, and these ran directly into the time of the people. The high chiefs or ari'i rahi were descendants from the gods, reckoned to be forty generations previous. In their presence commoners showed respect by stripping to the waist. The high chiefs erected marae as places of worship.

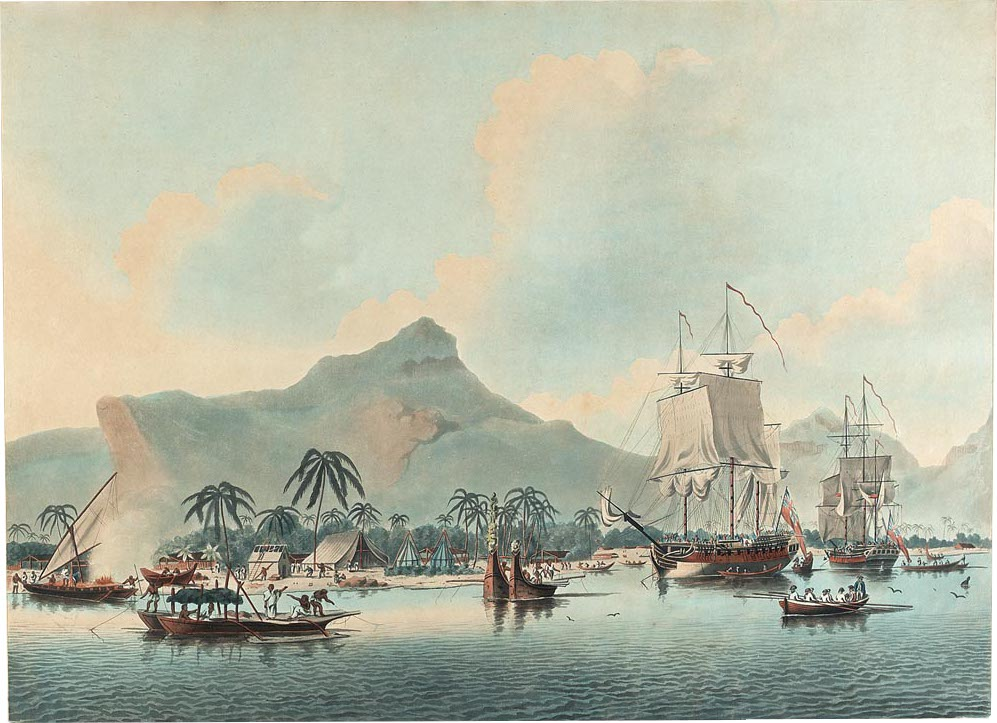
HMS Resolution and Discovery in Huahine, commanded by James Cook, depicted by John Cleveley. National Maritime Museum, Greenwich.

In the generations before Europeans arrived, a cult called 'Oro-maro-'ura developed: the cult of the red-feathered girdle. This became a tangible symbol of the chief's power. Key followers of the 'Oro cult were the 'arioi, who lived separately from the common people. They wore scented flowers and adorned themselves with scents and scarlet-dyed cloth. The head of each 'arioi group was heavily tattooed from ankle to thigh and known as a blackleg. Both male and female blacklegs were a privileged group but they were forbidden to have children. Their babies were all killed at birth. They received and gave lavish presents. They had a wide range of artistic skills and could be priests, navigators and lore specialists. Only good-looking men or women could become 'arioi. They played a crucial role in ceremonies associated with birth, deaths and marriage.

The Society Islands are home to the Taputapuātea Marae, a UNESCO world heritage site on Ra’iātea.

=== European contact ===
In 1767 HMS Dolphin, sailing under Captain Samuel Wallis, landed on Tahiti. The captain and crew were quite sick with scurvy on arrival and were keen to obtain fresh food. Europeans quickly found that the islanders were desperate to obtain iron, which was prized for use in woodworking and as fish-hooks. The sailors found that young women and girls were eager to exchange sex for a nail.

The islanders were delighted at the abundance of iron on the ship and tried to board the ship in search of iron. Wallis reported that he shot cannon to maintain control of his vessel and the iron on board.

Louis de Bougainville, a French nobleman, sailor and soldier, left France on his circumnavigation of the globe in 1766. By the time he reached the Society islands in 1768, his crew was stricken with scurvy. Despite the crew being twice as numerous as that of the Dolphin, the islanders had sufficient food to supply them in exchange for axes, knives, and other iron goods.

James Cook arrived in Tahiti in April 1769.

Between 1772 and 1775, the viceroy of Peru, the Spaniard Manuel Amat y Juniet, organized three expeditions to the Society Islands. Having news of James Cook's expedition and fearing British colonization of the island, he ordered a first expedition under the command of the Spanish sailor Domingo de Bonechea, with Tomás Gayangos as assistant, aboard the frigate "Águila". During the second expedition (1774-1775), Domingo de Bonechea and José Andía y Varela, aboard the ships "Águila" and "Júpiter", recognized or discovered a dozen islands between the archipelagos of Tuamotu and the Austral Islands, and established a mission in Tahiti, which lasted only a couple of years. Domingo de Bonechea, whose health was weakened, died during this expedition.

The islands became a French protectorate in 1843 and a colony in 1880 under the name of French Establishments of Oceania (Établissements Français d'Océanie, EFO).

== Geography ==
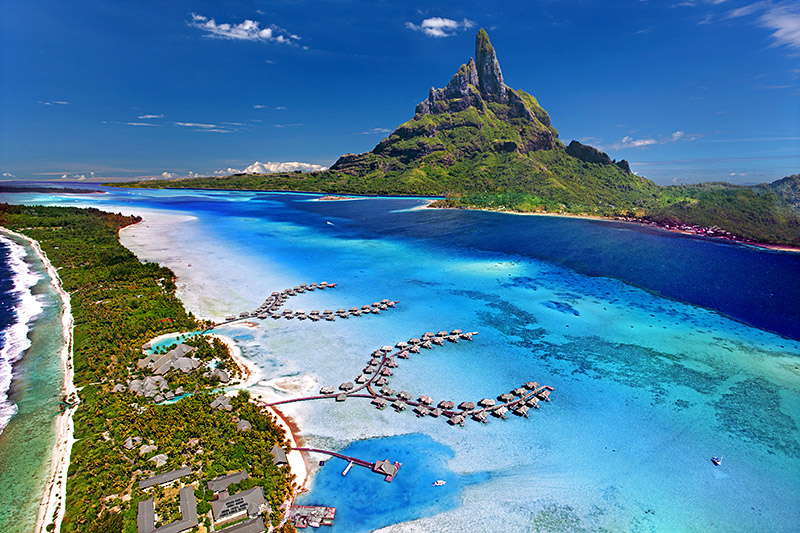
Bora Bora, Society Islands

The islands are divided, both geographically and administratively, into two groups:

- Windward Islands (Îles du Vent) (listed from east to west)
  - Mehetia
  - Tahiti
  - Teti'aroa
  - Moorea
  - Maiao
- Leeward Islands (Îles Sous-le-Vent)
  - Huahine
  - Raiatea
  - Taha'a
  - Bora Bora
  - Tupai
  - Maupiti
  - Mopelia
  - Motu One
  - Manuae

Society Islands
| Island | Population (2022 census) | Area | Group |
|---|---|---|---|
| Mehetia | 0 | 2.3 | Windward Islands |
| Tahiti | 191779 | 1044 | Windward Islands |
| Teti'aroa | 0 | 6 | Windward Islands |
| Moorea | 16191 | 134 | Windward Islands |
| Maiao | 343 | 8.8 | Windward Islands |
| Huahine | 6258 | 74.8 | Leeward Islands |
| Raiatea | 12545 | 167.7 | Leeward Islands |
| Taha'a | 5234 | 90.2 | Leeward Islands |
| Bora Bora | 10758 | 41.55 | Leeward Islands |
| Tupai | 0 | 11 | Leeward Islands |
| Maupiti | 1302 | 21.7 | Leeward Islands |
| Maupihaa | 20 | 2.6 | Leeward Islands |
| Motu One | 0 | 2.829 | Leeward Islands |
| Manuae | 40 | 3.5 | Leeward Islands |

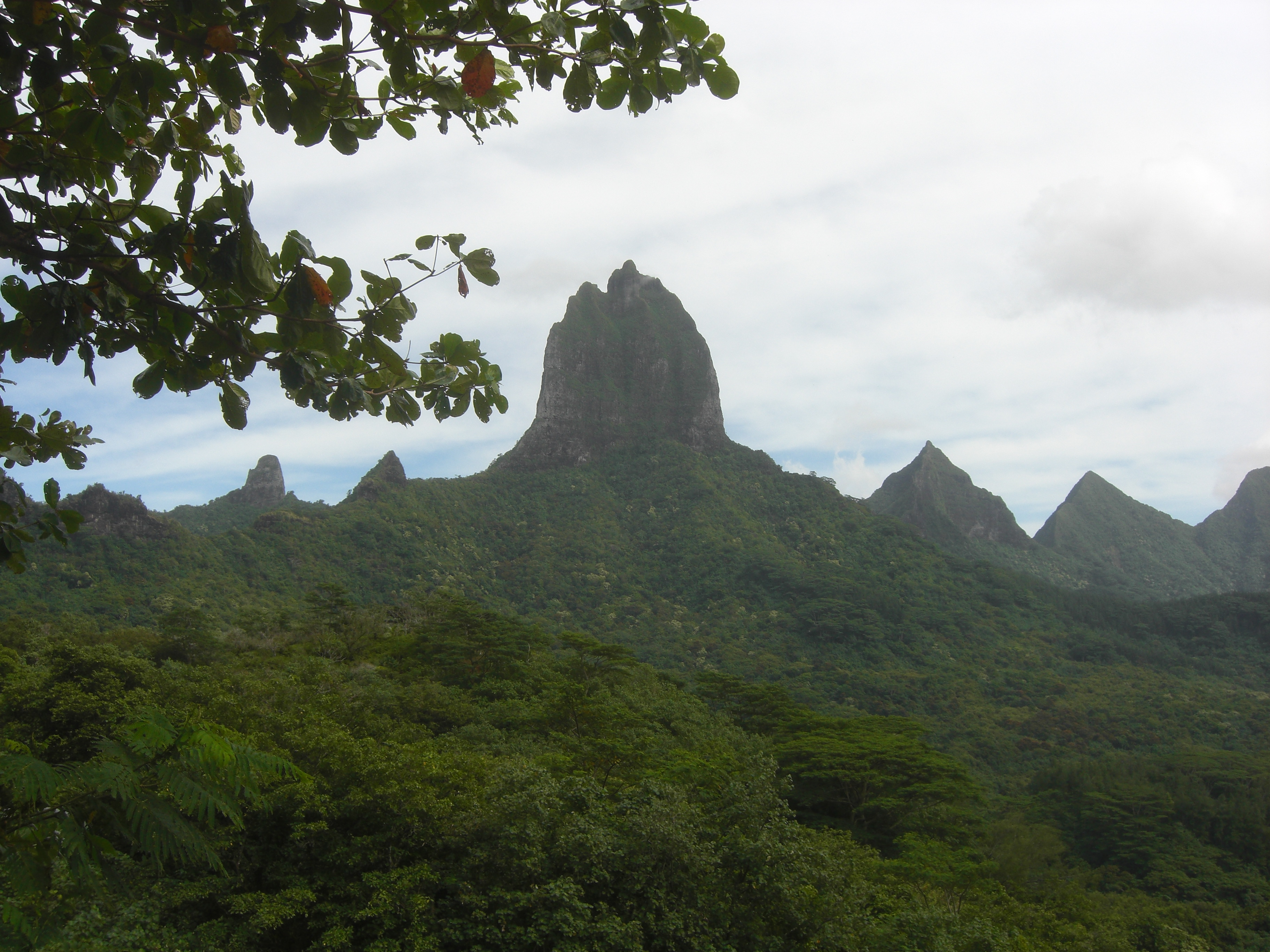
View of Mou'a Roa (880 m), Mo'orea Island

Combined, the Society Islands have a population of 275,918 inhabitants (as of 2017) and a land area of 1,590 square kilometres (610 sq mi). They represent the most economically important of the five archipelagos of French Polynesia. The highest point is Mount Orohena, which reaches 2,241 meters, located on the island of Tahiti.

The population of the islands is concentrated in the coastal regions and becomes increasingly sparse towards the mountainous center of the islands. The main island of Tahiti (Îles du Vent), where 50% of the inhabitants live, is also home to the capital of French Polynesia, the city of Papeete.

=== Geology ===
The Society Islands are a hotspot volcanic chain consisting of ten islands and atolls. The chain is oriented along the N. 65° W. direction, parallel to the movement of the Pacific Plate. Due to the plate movement over the Society hotspot, the age of the islands decreases from 5 Ma at Maupiti to 0 Ma at Mehetia, where Mehetia is the inferred current location of the hotspot as evidenced by recent seismic activity. Maupiti, the oldest island in the chain, is a highly eroded shield volcano with at least 12 thin lava flows, which accumulated fairly rapidly between 4.79 and 4.05 Ma. Bora Bora is another highly eroded shield volcano consisting of basaltic lavas accumulated between 3.83 and 3.1 Ma. The lavas are intersected by post-shield dikes. Tahaʻa consists of shield-stage basalt with an age of 3.39 Ma, followed by additional eruptions 1.2 Ma later. Raiatea consists of shield-stage basalt followed by post-shield trachytic lava flows, all occurring from 2.75 to 2.29 Ma. Huahine consists of two coalesced basalt shield volcanoes, Huahine Nui and Huahine Iti, with several flows followed by post-shield trachyphonolitic lava domes from 3.08 to 2.06 Ma. Moʻorea consists of at least 16 flows of shield-stage basalt and post-shield lavas from 2.15 to 1.36 Ma. Tahiti consists of two basalt shield volcanoes, Tahiti Nui and Tahiti Iti, with an age range of 1.67 to 0.25 Ma.

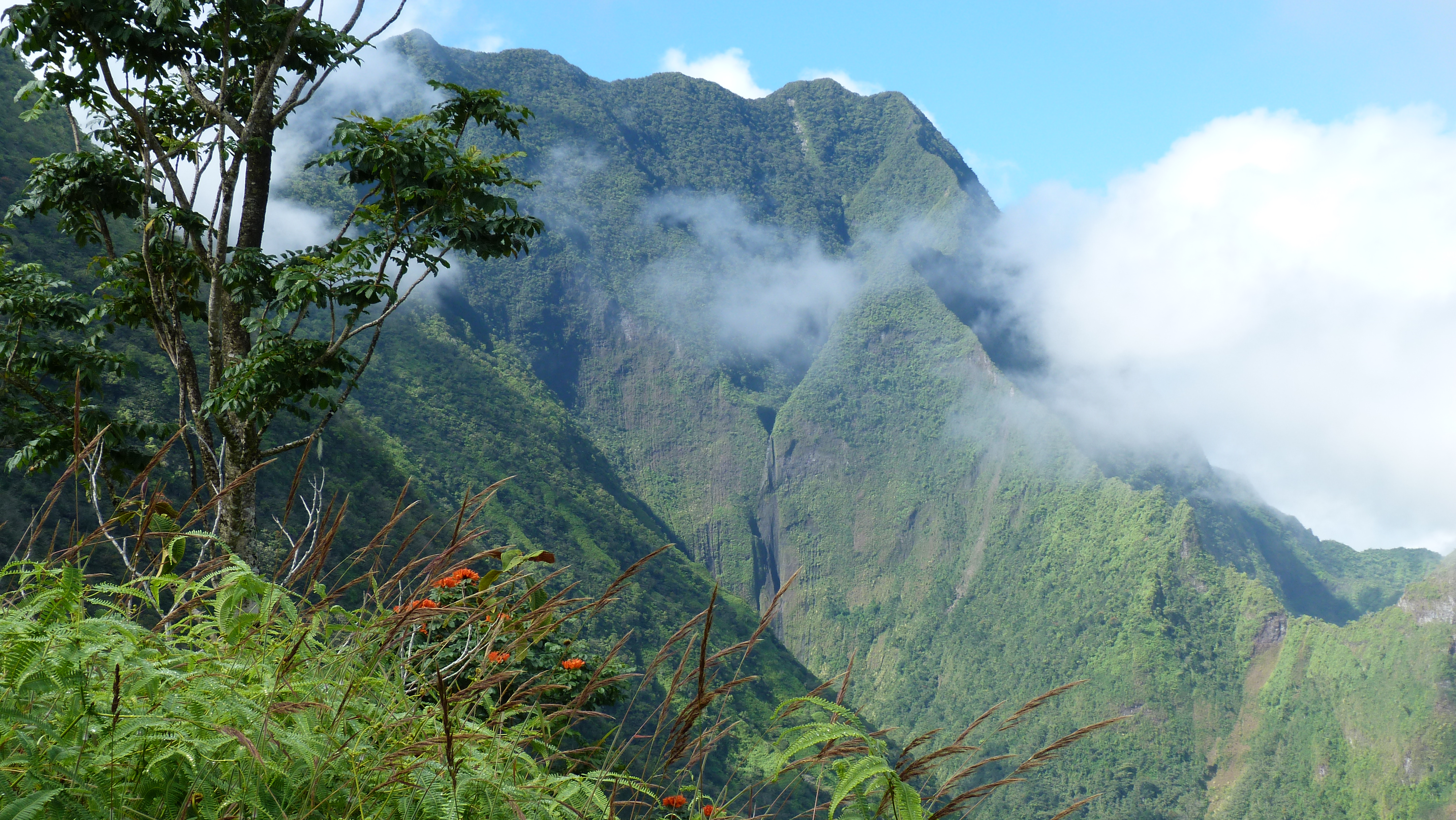
Mount Aorai in northwestern part Tahiti

=== Fauna and flora ===
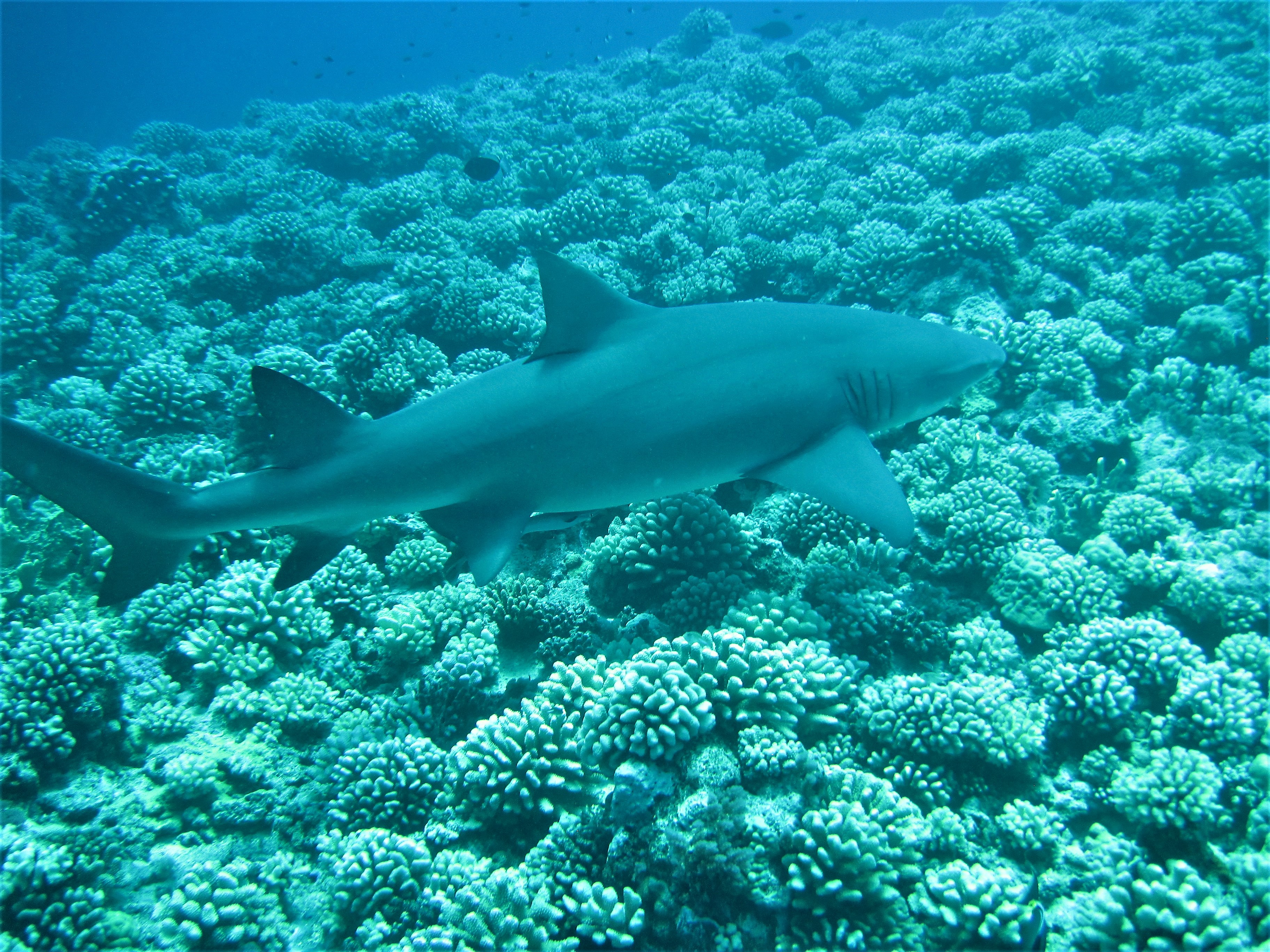
Shark on the Moorea reef

The tropical forests of French Polynesia are home to a great variety of rare animals and plants.

Above all, the islands are known for their olfactory landscape. The Tahitian tiaré (Gardenia taitensis), which blooms exclusively on the Society Islands, and is now protected.

The atolls surrounding the islands are covered with numerous corals, around which butterfly and clown fish frolic. Manta rays also reside here.

However, part of the underwater world of French Polynesia has been affected by nuclear tests conducted by the French government between 1966 and 1968.

=== Climate ===
The climate of the islands varies between tropical and subtropical due to their size. The heat and very high humidity, together with the islands' fertile volcanic soils, have created dense, mostly inaccessible tropical forests. There are two seasons: a warm one, which lasts from November to March, and a cooler one, from April to October.

Climatic Table
| January | February | March | April | May | June | July | August | September | October | November | December | December |
|---|---|---|---|---|---|---|---|---|---|---|---|---|
| 27.0 °C | 27.1 °C | 27.4 °C | 27.1 °C | 26.4 °C | 25.2 °C | 24.7 °C | 24.6 °C | 25.0 °C | 25.6 °C | 26.3 °C | 26.6 °C | 26.6 °C |

== Religion ==
Most of the population of the Society Islands profess Christianity, including various Protestant Christian denominations and the Roman Catholic Church. The Protestants arrived with the first English explorers, while the Catholics settled in the area first with the arrival of the Spanish and permanently with the beginning of the French colonization of the region, which was consolidated with the establishment of a protectorate over the islands. By 1774, the Spanish had settled in the region briefly and installed a large cross that they brought from their colonies in Peru.

In January 1775, the priest Fray Jerónimo Clota celebrated the first Catholic mass on the islands. The Spanish did not remain in the area due to the continuing uprisings in other of their colonies.

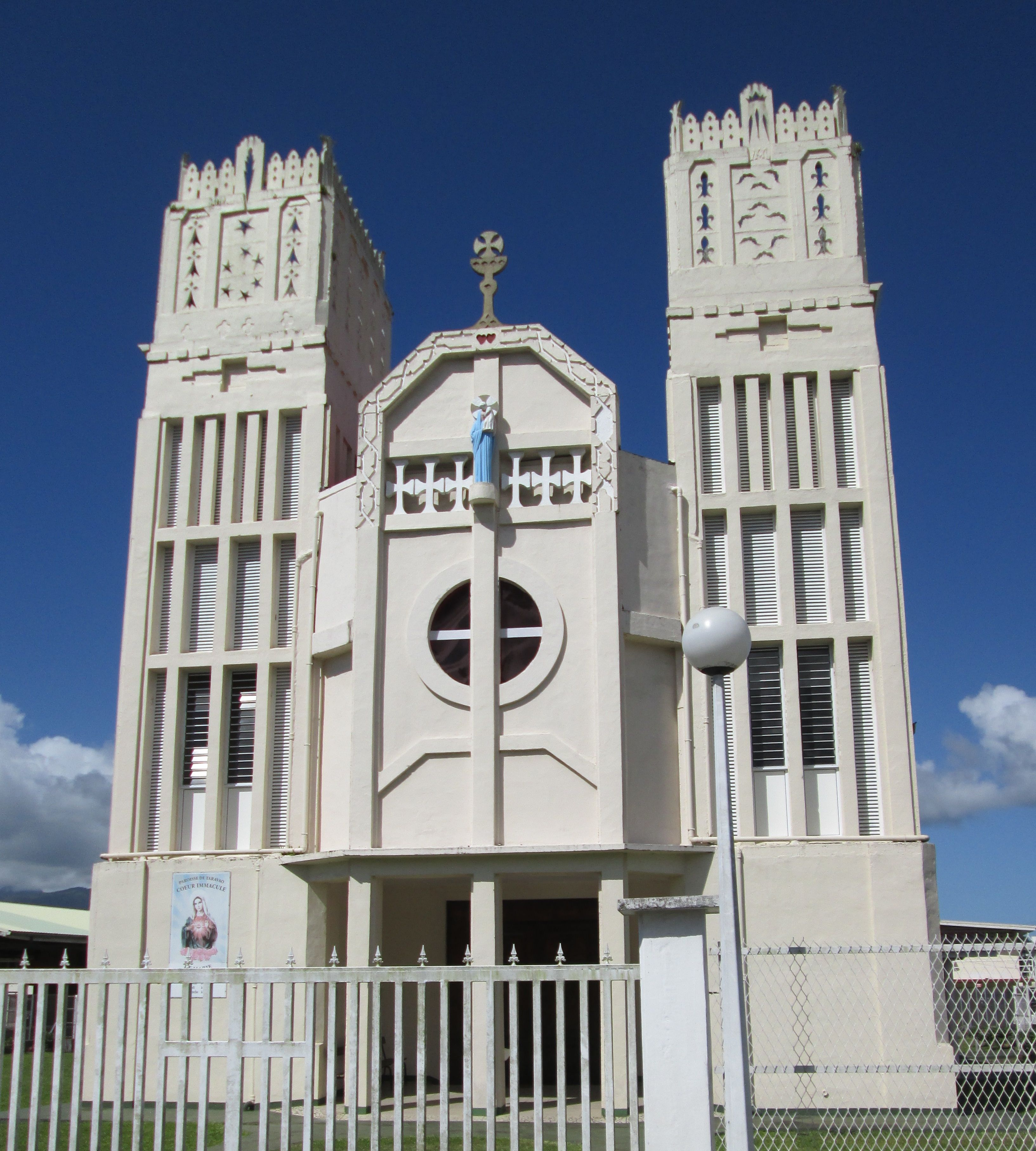
Sacred Heart Church in Taravao (Église du Sacré-Coeur de Taravao), Tahiti

Queen Pōmare IV expelled French Catholic missionaries from her kingdom in 1836 and provoked the annoyance of France. Between 1838 and 1842, French naval commander Abel Aubert du Petit-Thouars responded to French complaints and forced the queen and Tahitian chiefs to cede Tahiti as a French protectorate. In the 1880s France formally annexed the islands.

The Catholic Church runs at least 45 religious buildings in the area, which are part of the Archdiocese of Papeete with headquarters on the island of Tahiti. The Cathedral of Our Lady of the Immaculate Conception (Cathédrale Notre-Dame de l'Immaculée Conception) stands out on the island.

On each island, the religious situation is different. On Bora Bora, for example, there are more Protestant Christians than Catholic Christians, as a result of the fact that the English arrived there before the French, however, both groups now regularly perform ecumenical Christian acts and live together.

== Transport ==
Each of the Society Islands has a small airport. Faaʻa International Airport is located in Tahiti and is the largest airport in the Society Islands.
