= Motu One (Society Islands) =

Atoll in French Polynesia

Native name: Motu One
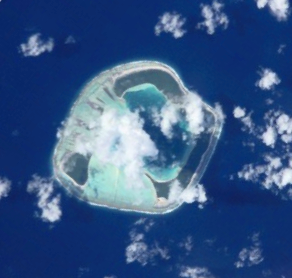
- NASA picture of Motu One Atoll

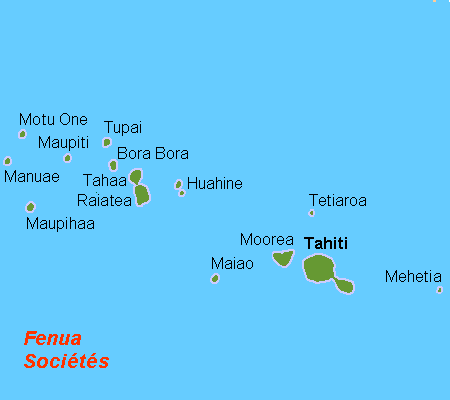

Geography
- Location: 15°48′50″S 154°31′30″W
- Archipelago: Society Islands
- Area: 2.829 km^{2} (1.092 sq mi)

Administration
- France
- Overseas collectivity: French Polynesia

Demographics
- Population: 0

Motu One, also known as Bellinghausen, is an atoll in the Leeward group of the Society Islands, in the South Pacific. Motu One is located 550 km northwest from Tahiti and 72 km northeast of Manuae, its closest neighbor.

Motu One's reef encloses totally a lagoon without a pass. All of its sides are covered with low, wooded sandy islands except for its southern side. Motu One means Sand Island in Tahitian, that is a low-lying, sandy islet that cannot sustain permanent human habitation.

== History ==
The name Atoll Bellinghausen or more rarely Bellingshausen was given to this small atoll by Otto von Kotzebue, an officer and navigator of Baltic German descent in the Imperial Russian Navy, in honour of Fabian Gottlieb von Bellingshausen. It should not be confused with Bellingshausen Island, part of the South Sandwich Islands, in the southwest Atlantic.

The atoll was visited by the US Exploring Expedition in Sept. 1839.

== Administration ==
Motu One Atoll is administratively part of the commune (municipality) of Maupiti, itself in the administrative subdivision of the Leeward Islands.

== See also ==
- French Polynesia
