= Maupiti =

Atoll in French Polynesia

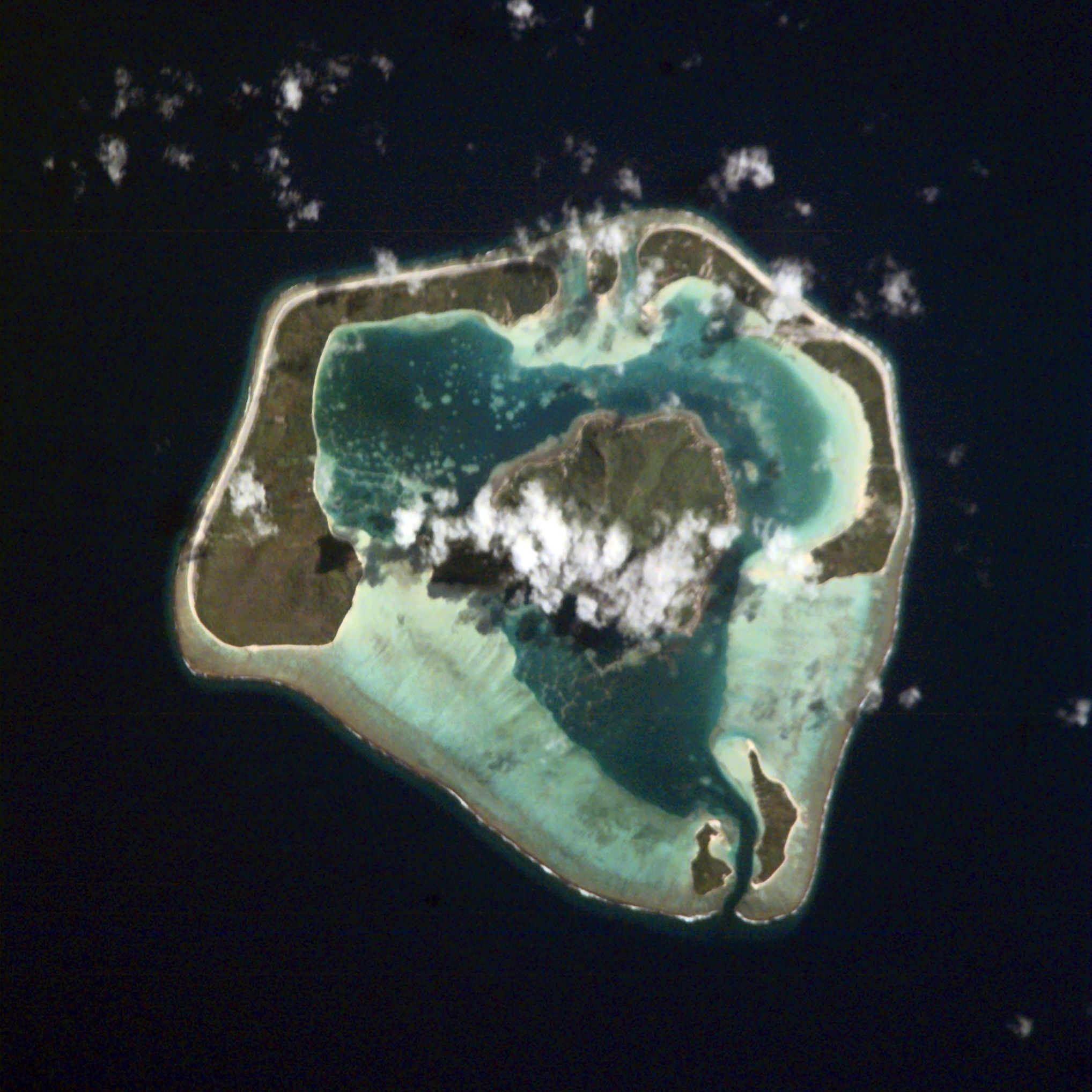
- NASA aerial picture of Maupiti

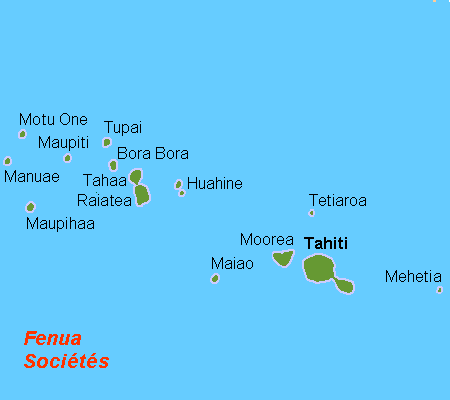

Geography
- Location: Pacific Ocean
- Coordinates: 16°26′24.3″S 152°16′27.3″W
- Archipelago: Society Islands
- Major islands: Maupiti
- Area: 11 km^{2} (4.2 sq mi)
- Highest elevation: 380 m (1250 ft)

Administration
- France
- Overseas collectivity: French Polynesia
- Administrative subdivision: Leeward Islands
- Commune: Maupiti

Demographics
- Population: 1,200
- Pop. density: 109/km^{2} (282/sq mi)

Additional information
- Flag

Maupiti is an island in the western Leeward Islands in French Polynesia. It is the westernmost volcanic island in the archipelago, 315 kilometres (196 miles) northwest of Tahiti and 40 kilometres (25 miles) west of Bora Bora. It has a population of 1,286 people. The largest town is Vaiea.

== Geography ==
Maupiti is a volcanic island in a chain formed by the Society hotspot. It is estimated to be 3.9–4.5 million years old. The island is a "near atoll", consisting of a central volcanic peak surrounded by a lagoon and barrier reef with five motu: Auira, Pa'ao, Tuanai, Tiapaa and Pitiahe. The lagoon has an area of 27 square kilometres (10 square miles), and the central island has an area of 12 square kilometres (4.6 square miles) and a maximum elevation of 372 metres (1,220 feet).

== History ==
There are ancient Polynesian archaeological artifacts dating from at least AD 850 in Maupiti. A burial site excavated in 1962 suggested early cultural links with New Zealand.

The first European to arrive on the island was the Dutchman Jakob Roggeveen in 1722. Historically, the island has had strong cultural links with Bora Bora.

== Economy ==
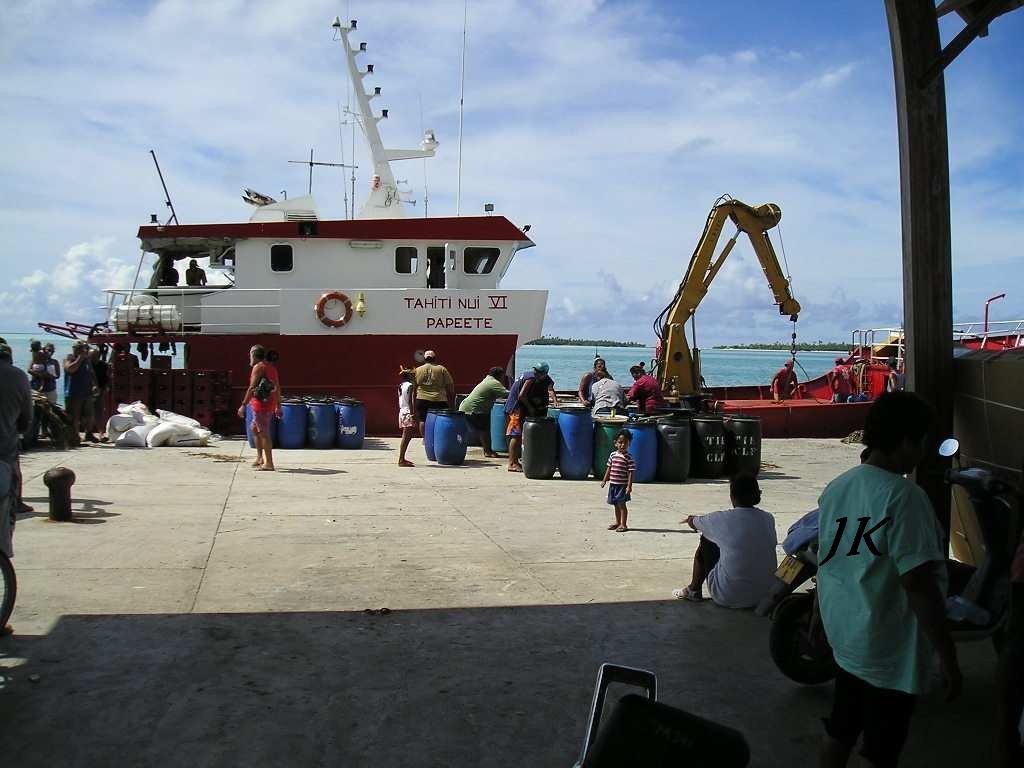
A Maupiti supply ship. The blue barrels on the dock are noni which is sent to Papeete for processing.

Maupiti Airport, located on the motu of Tuanai, provides a connection to the rest of French Polynesia. The primary economic activity on Maupiti is noni production.

== Administration ==
Maupiti is administratively part of the commune (municipality) of Maupiti, itself in the administrative subdivision of the Leeward Islands. The main settlement is Vaiea.
