= Manuaʻe (Society Islands) =

Atoll in French Polynesia

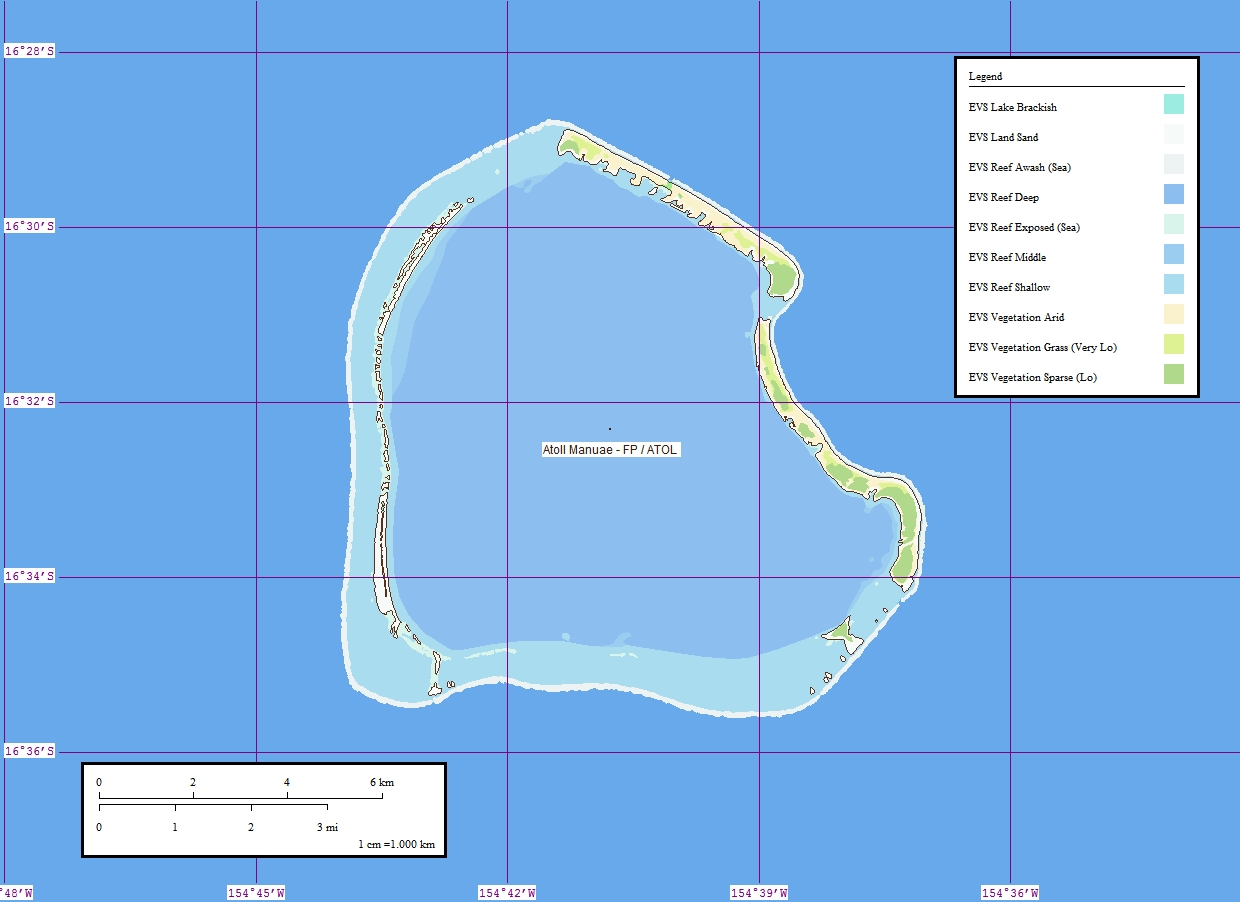
- Map of Manuaʻe

Geography
- Location: South Pacific Ocean
- Coordinates: 16°31′S 154°42′W
- Archipelago: Society Islands; Leeward Islands
- Area: 3.5 km^{2} (1.4 sq mi)

Administration
- France
- Overseas country: French Polynesia

Demographics
- Population: c. 40 (2011)
- Pop. density: 11.43/km^{2} (29.6/sq mi)

The atoll of Manuaʻe, also known as Scilly, is located approximately 60 km (37 mi) to the northwest of Maupiha'a (a.k.a. Mopelia) and 255 km (158 mi) to the west of Maupiti, in the South Pacific. It is the westernmost of the Society Islands' Leeward Islands, located 217 mi. (350 km) west of Bora Bora and 342 mi. (550 km) west of Pape'ete.

== Other names ==
Other names given to Manuaʻe include Fenua 'Ura and Putai (Tahitian), Isla de Pájaros ("Island of Birds", in Spanish), and Scilly (English).

== See also ==
- Maupiti (commune)
- Desert island
- List of islands
