= Why I Am a Hindu =

2018 book by Shashi Tharoor

- Author: Shashi Tharoor
- Language: English
- Subject: Hinduism
- Genre: Nonfiction
- Publisher: Aleph Book Company
- Publication date: 19 January 2018
- Publication place: India
- Media type: Print (hardcover)
- Pages: 320
- ISBN: 978-9386021106
- Preceded by: Inglorious Empire
- Followed by: The Paradoxical Prime Minister

Why I Am a Hindu is a 2018 non-fiction book by Indian politician, author, and former bureaucrat Shashi Tharoor, published by Aleph Book Company. In the book, Tharoor describes the history of Hinduism and its core tenets, as well as sociocultural developments in India that relate to the religion, while elucidating his own religious convictions. In the book, Tharoor seeks to position the debate among various factions within India as one within the Hindu faith, and writes about his own personal identification with the religion.

The book is organized in three parts, moving from a brief history of Hinduism and the author's personal faith. The book was followed by Tharoor’s 2019 book, The Hindu Way - An Introduction To Hinduism, which is presented as an introduction to Hinduism.

== Background ==
Tharoor, a Member of Parliament for the Indian National Congress, has stated that he wrote the book in response to what he was as the appropriation of Hinduism by some factions.

== Synopsis ==
The book is divided into three parts.

=== Part one: "My Hinduism" ===
In the first part of the book, Tharoor recounts the development of his own faith and presents Hinduism as an eclectic tradition without a single founder, central authority, or concept of heresy. He discusses the figures he regards as central to the tradition, including Adi Shankara, Patanjali, Ramanuja, Ramakrishna, and Swami Vivekananda, and outlines schools of thoughts within Hinduism, such as Advaita Vedanta, along with related concepts of 'Purushartha' and 'Bhakti'. He has also described "Hinduism of habit", the tradition practiced by ordinary followers, and emphasizes tradition of accommodation of doubt and questioning.

=== Part two: political Hinduism ===
The second part focuses on the rise of political Hinduism in India. Tharoor differentiates between Hinduism as a religion, and the political ideologies associated with factions within the faith.

=== Part three: "Taking back Hinduism" ===
The third part argues for reclaiming Hinduism from religious fundamentalists for a pluralistic and secular vision of India. He contends that India has endured a plural, secular democracy, largely because of the diversity and tolerance ascribed to Hinduism.

== Reception ==
The book has received mixed assessments. Kancha Ilaiah writing for The Caravan, wrote a critical book review in which he questioned the theories put forth by Tharoor for praising Hinduism, while being unaware of his own caste. MK Raghavendra of Firstpost wrote that “books such as Shashi Tharoor’s 'Why I am a Hindu' simply take sides in the Left vs Right unproductive struggle, without adding much of intellectual value to the socio-political issues confronting India today.”

Raheel Shakeel reviewed the book for Newsline, calling it “timely” which “comes at a time when India is at a crossroads”. He further wrote that “the book simplifies the many strands of Hindu thought for a general audience, and outlines the threat posed to it by the enemy within.” Urmi Chanda-Vaz of Scroll called the book “a timely reminder of why Hinduism must retain its pluralism”. She further wrote that “Why I Am A Hindu is as balanced a book on religion as one can hope to write in these tumultuous times.” However, she criticised the part three of the book, stating that it was written hastily.
