= Jhimli Mukherjee Pandey =

Indian writer, translator, and journalist (1972–2021)

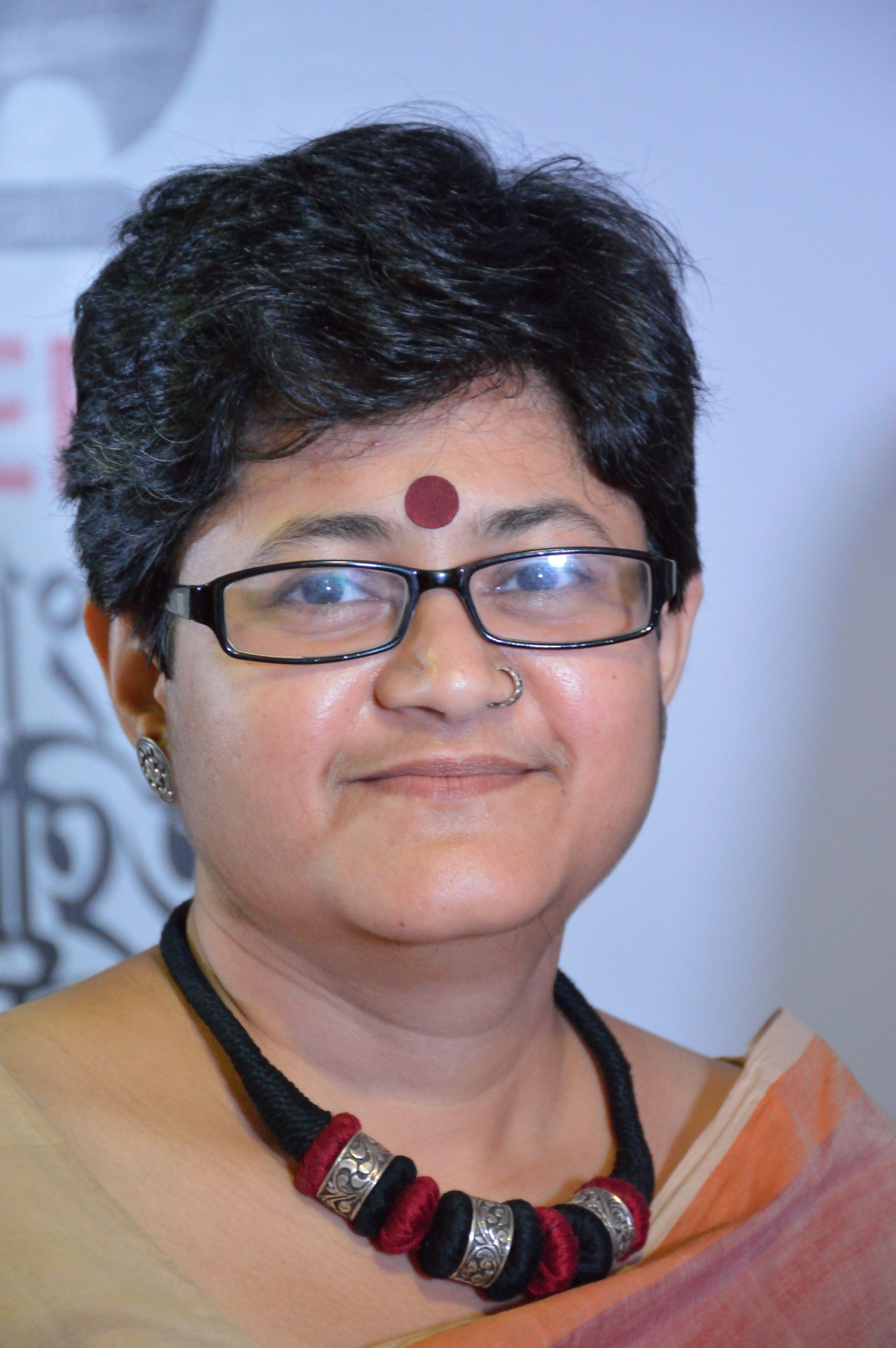
- Born: 1972; Kolkata, India
- Died: 30 December 2021 (aged 48–49); Jaisalmer, India
- Citizenship: Indian
- Occupations: Journalist, writer, and translator
- Writing career
- Language: Bengali, English

Jhimli Mukherjee Pandey (1972–2021) was an Indian journalist, translator, and writer. She worked as a journalist and editor with The Times of India for 24 years, and authored eight books in the Bengali language. In addition, she published several translations, including Bengali editions of two books by politician and writer Shashi Tharoor, as well as books by Sunil Gangopadhay and Amar Mitra. She died in 2021, following a car accident.

== Life ==
Pandey was born, and lived in Kolkata, in West Bengal, India. She married Ramesh Pandey, and they had a son, Vaibhav.

== Career ==
Pandey began her career working with The Statesman, an English-language newspaper, and later worked with The Times of India, a leading English-language daily newspaper from India, for 24 years, reporting on communities, heritage, and education, as well as being a senior assistant editor. She also was a key organiser for the Times Literary Festival, an arts festival organised in Kolkata annually by The Times of India.

As an author, Jhimli wrote in the Bengali language and English. She wrote eight novels in Bengali, 25 short stories for children, and a novel in English. Pandey also co-wrote A Gift of Goddess Lakshmi (Penguin 2017), the autobiography of Manobi Bandopadhyay, a woman who overcame significant social challenges to become the first transgender college principal in India, along with Bandopadhyay herself. The book received reviews in the Hindustan Times and The Hindu^{.} Her English-language novel, Not Just Another Story (Aleph Book Company 2019), was based on her research on Sonagachi, Kolkata's red-light district, and described the lives of three sex workers.

As a translator, Pandey translated several works from English to Bengali, including two books by writer and politician Shashi Tharoor: his novel, The Great Indian Novel, and a non-fiction book, Inglorious Empire: What the British Did to India. She also translated a Bengali book by Amar Mitra to English, which was published posthumously, in 2022, as well as Sunil Gangopadhyay's novel, Interrogation .

== Death ==
Pandey died in a car accident on 30 December 2021, while on vacation in Jaisalmer, Rajasthan, at the age of 49. Following her death, the Chief Minister of West Bengal, Mamata Banerjee, described her death as "creating a void in the world of journalism," and Shashi Tharoor, whose works she had translated, also released a statement in her memory.

== Bibliography ==
Authored:

- Manobi Bandyopadhyay, Jhimli Mukherjee Pandey, A Gift of Goddess Lakshmi (Penguin, 2017) ISBN 9780143425946
- Jhimli Mukherjee Pandey, Not Just Another Story (Aleph Book Company 2019) ISBN 9789388292955

Translated:

- Sunil Gangopadhay, Interrogation (Bee Books, 2012) (translated from Bengali to English by Jhimli Mukherjee Pandey) ISBN 9789380925110
- Ranjana Bandhopadhyay, Kadambari Devi's suicide-note (Bee Books, 2015) (translated from Bengali to English by Jhimli Mukherjee Pandey) ISBN 9789380925172
- Amar Mitra, Dhanapatir Char : whatever happened to Pedru's island? (Ebury Press 2022) ISBN 9780670095223
