= South Asian literature =

Literature of Indian subcontinent communities and their diasporas

South Asian literature refers to the literature that is composed by authors in the Indian subcontinent and its diaspora. It has an extensive history with some of the earliest known pieces of literature. South Asia has many different languages that have been spoken due to its size and how long people have been inhabiting it. This has caused the region to be the most linguistically diverse region in the planet, and as well as having four language families (Dravidian, Indo-European, Austro-Asiatic and Tibeto-Burman), hundreds of languages and thousands of dialects. Many modern pieces of South Asian literature are written in English for a global audience. Many of the ancient texts of the subcontinent have been lost due to the inability to preserve verbally transmitted literature. South Asia has many significant authors that shaped the postcolonial period and response to the British establishment in the subcontinent. Modern South Asian literature has a deep focus on independence from Britain, mainly expressed in prose, this literature commonly discusses the partition of India and how different South Asian nations, religions, and cultures interact with each other. Countries to which South Asian literature's writers are linked include India, Pakistan, Bangladesh, Sri Lanka and Nepal. Works from Bhutan, Myanmar, Tibet, and the Maldives are sometimes also included.

South Asian literature is written in English as well as the many national and regional languages of the region.

For the literature of South Asian cultures, see:

- Bangladeshi literature
  - Bengali literature
- Indian literature
  - Angika literature
  - Assamese literature
  - Bengali literature
  - Bhojpuri literature
  - Braj Bhasha literature
  - Gujarati literature
  - Hindi literature
  - Indian English literature
  - Kannada literature
  - Kashmiri literature
  - Konkani literature
  - Kokborok literature
  - Malayalam literature
  - Marathi literature
  - Mizo literature
  - Nepali literature
  - Odia literature
  - Punjabi literature
  - Rajasthani literature
  - Sanskrit literature
  - Tamil literature
  - Telugu literature
  - Urdu literature
- Nepali literature
- Pakistani literature
  - Pashto literature
  - Kashmiri literature
  - Punjabi literature
  - Sindhi literature
  - Urdu literature
- Sri Lankan literature
  - Tamil literature

== History ==
South Asian literature has a long history, having some of the oldest recorded pieces of literature, dating back to the later stages of the Bronze Age in India. Transmitted in Sanskrit, Rig veda is an ancient and sacred collection of Hindu texts originally composed between 1500 BCE and 1200 BCE by Indo-Aryan tribes that were migrating from modern Afghanistan to northern India. When migrating, these Indo-Aryan tribes encountered the aboriginal nations of the subcontinent who had their own languages and literature; some of these languages are thought to be of Dravidian origin and other languages belonged to Munda. Literature was not written down but it was transmitted verbally in these times. The first evidence of written language in the region was in Prakrit in the 3rd century BCE. These were the religious Ashokan edicts that were inscribed on pillars. The Aboriginal tribes had their own forms of literature, though, due to language only being communicated verbally for a long period of time, many ancient pieces of literature were lost.

Punjabi literature developed later than most as the first writings of Punjabi was only written in 1324, written by Amir Khusro through a war ballad of the battle between Tughlaq and Khurso. Though the first identifiable Punjabi was written in the 16th century, known as Janam-Sakhi, it is written by Bhai Bala, and is intended to be a biography of his companion Guru Nanak. From then on, Punjabi literature expanded significantly, though literacy in these times was very uncommon and only the noble born were able to have a significant hold on language. This depended on those individuals' social status and caste. In the 17th century, a writer known as Abdullah Lahori, composed a work called Bāra Anva. This work was a disquisition on Islam, and because of this many Sufi works of literature were composed. Poets such as Bulleh Shah, Baba Farid and Shah Hussain were Sufi poets whereby many of their ideas were a significant stimulus to Punjabi literature during the mediaeval periods.

Bengali literature is divided into three different parts: Ancient, Mediaeval, and Modern. Bengali literature began with the mystic hymns of Charyapada, written between the 8th and 12th century, It is composed of 47 hymns and was written by Buddhist monks. During this ancient period (600 AD - 1200 AD), most of the literature pertained to religious texts, as a result, Bengali texts are only partly able to be deciphered and are called the twilight language. The mediaeval period (1200 AD - 1800 AD) of Bengali literature is split into three phases: Early, High and Late. The early phase fostered the development of the Bengali alphabet. In this period, rhymes, anecdotes and a song began to appear. During the high phase, the Bengali region was under Muslim rule, significantly influencing the literature during this period. Bengali writers commonly would write on their culture, religion and history. Bengali literature also developed in translation literature, Govindamangal is the earliest known translation in Bengali literature and was a translation of Sanskrit. The late mediaeval phase was characterised through the diminishing Muslim control and the increase in control of British due to their establishment in South Asia.

== Modern Literature ==
Modern South Asian literature has been most heavily impacted by the British colonisation of the subcontinent. The modern era of literature began around 1860, this was prompted after the dissolvement of the East India Company and Queen Victoria rising to Empress of India after the Government of India Act of 1858. The British colonisation was so widespread, affecting almost all areas of the subcontinent. Due to this colonisation and despite the large number of languages, English has been one of the most frequent languages in which modern South Asian literature is written. The main reason for English's use in modern literature was the insistence of reformists like Rammohan Ray for the English language and education as a vehicle for India to rise as a global nation.

Punjabi literature underwent a transformation after its colonisation, whereby the conventional genres of literature changed adding elements of nationalism and uses techniques like satire for political commentary. After the partition of 1947, Western Punjabi writers (Modern Pakistan) treat this modern period as a rediscovery of language and identity. During this period of revitalisation, the Punjabi language and the Sikh identity were under heavy attacks from the British and Hindus. They suffered persecution and humiliation, whereby acts of publicly shaving the heads and beards of tahtia Sikhs occurred so that Sikhs would assimilate into mainstream culture. Authors like Vir Singh used the Punjabi language to critique and reinvigorate core values of Sikhism.

Bengali literature, like all other South Asian literature, transformed significantly due to British rule in South Asia. Modern Bengali literature developed quickly and went through many phases. Christian missionaries influenced the writers, prose writing developed quickly and was one of the most common forms of writing. Bengali experienced very high levels of growth after Rabindranath Tagore's literature was recognised with a Nobel Prize, effectively putting Bengali literature on a global scale. After 1947, the partition of India and the split between East and West Bengal, literature developed differently on each side of Bengal predominantly due to differing ideologies and religion.

== Notable Literary Figures ==
=== Vyasa ===
Vyasa (also known as Krishna Dvaipayana) was a legendary Indian sage and the writer of the Hindu epic Mahabharata, considered as one of the most significant writings in South Asian literature. Vayasa is usually not believed to be a historical figure, but is still worshipped by some Hindus in the modern day. Vyasa was said to have lived around 1500 BCE, but is considered as one of the seven Chiranjeevis (immortal beings) in Hinduism. Vyasa's role as the sacred compiler makes him incredibly significant within Hinduism. A holiday known as Guru Purnima is celebrated in dedication towards him, where he is honoured in temples on the first moon of July.

=== Tenali Ramakrishna ===
Tenali Ramakrishna (known as Tenali Rama) was an Indian-born poet in the late 16th century CE. Tenali was a part of the Telugu people and originated from Tenali. He was a court poet in the Vijayanagar Empire to the emperor, Krishnadevaraya; Tenali was recognised as one of the eight Ashtadiggajas. Known as the ‘Humorous Poet’, Tenali was noted to have high intelligence; Tenali wrote the book Panduranga Mahatyam, which is considered as one of the five great books of Telugu literature. In modern times Tenali is still a part of modern culture whereby many films and books recreate the life of Tenali Rama.

=== Dr Shashi Tharoor ===
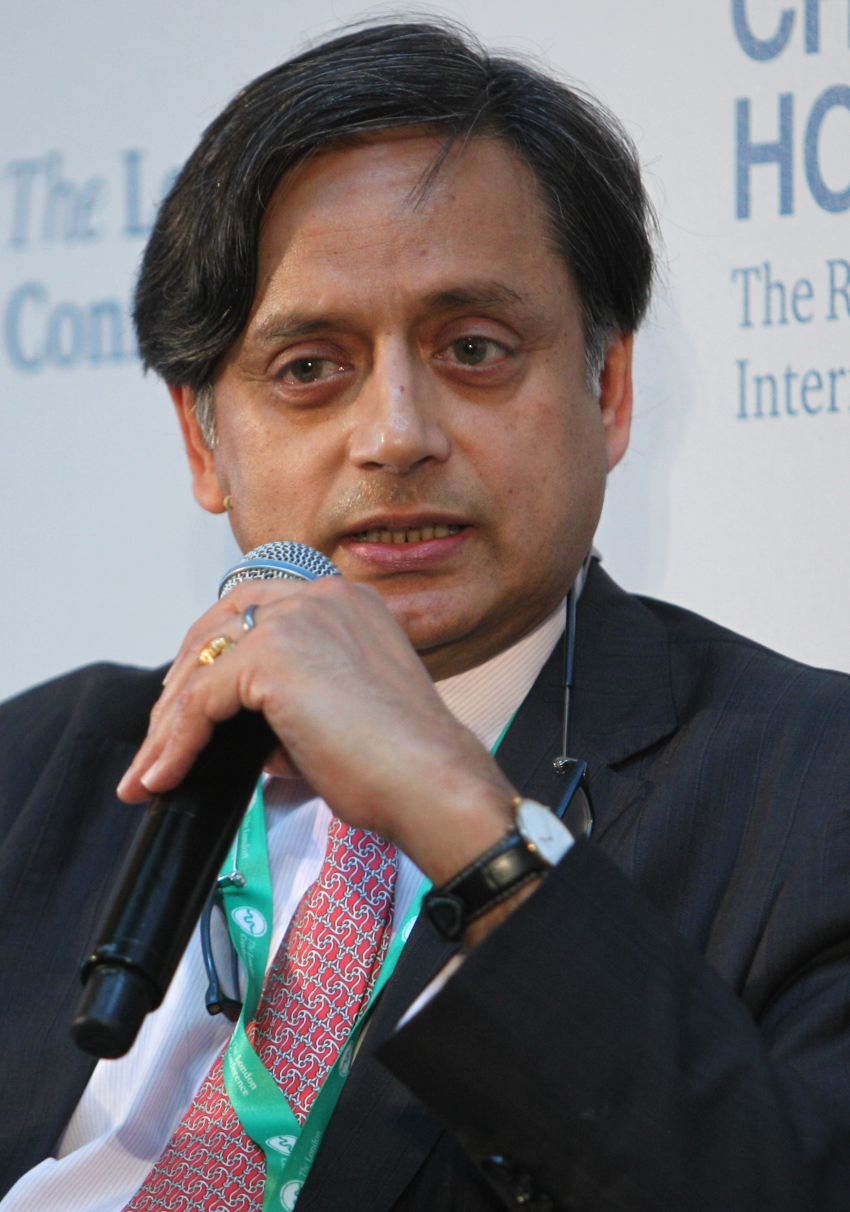
Photo of Shashi Tharoor at conference

Dr Shashi Tharoor is a significant modern Indian writer and statesman who wrote very significant pieces of literature about the continuing Indian Postcolonial movement. Tharoor is most known for being a famous international diplomat and Indian politician. In literature, Tharoor is known for his satirical books such as ‘The Great Indian Novel’ and his books on discussions of India's past and present such as ‘India: From Midnight to the Millennium’ a book quoted by Bill Clinton. Shashi Tharoor has been one of the most influential voices in Indian politics as he was the most followed politician until 2013. Tharoor still writes political commentary in books such as ‘The New World Order and the Indian Imperative’.

=== Rabindranath Tagore ===
Rabindranath Tagore was a Bengali polymath which shaped modern South Asian literature by introducing Asian literature and more specifically Indian literature to the world. Tagore was awarded with the Nobel Prize in literature on the basis of his poetic prose ‘Gitanjali’ and his multifaceted talents. Tagore was the first non-European person to receive a Nobel Prize, causing him to become a ‘global phenomenon’, and was the ‘most prominent embodiment of how the west wanted to see the east’. Tagore was recognised as against the British Raj, seen through his renouncement of his knighthood after the Jallianwalabagh massacre of April 1919, writing to Lord Chelmsford he said:

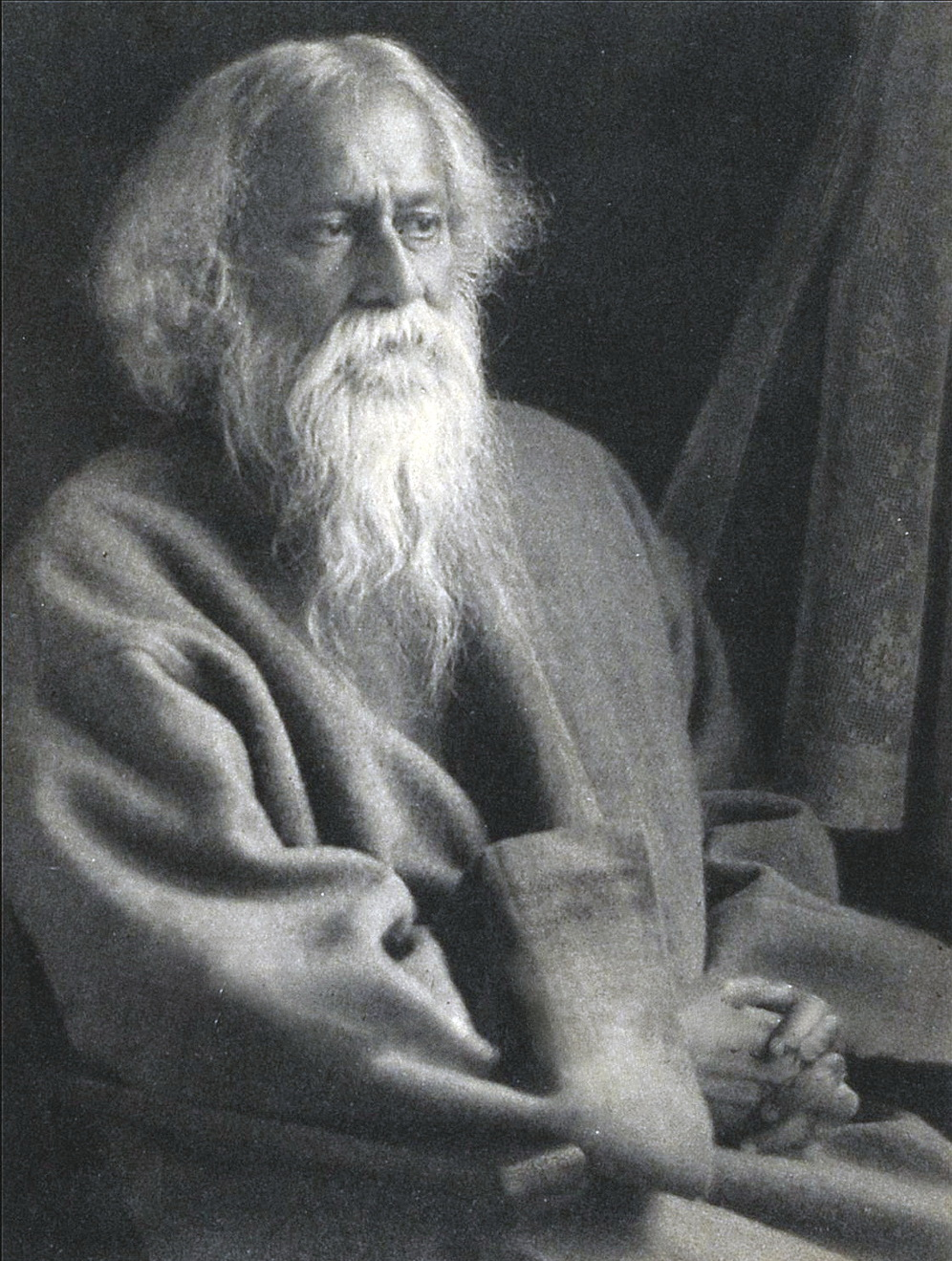
Black and White photo of Rabindranath Tagore

'The time has come when badges of honour make our shame glaring in the incongruous context of humiliation, and I for my part, wish to stand, shorn, of all special distinctions, by the side of those of my countrymen who, for their so-called insignificance, are liable to suffer degradation not fit for human beings.'

Mainly done as a protest toward the British Raj, this piece of writing remains as a significant writing in protest literature. Tagore's influence still remains to this day through his songs. Bangladesh's national anthem became Amar Shonar Bangla in 1971, written in 1905, it was a melody that protested the first partition of Bengal. Further, his work Jana Gana Mana, composed in 1911, became the national anthem of India in 1950.

=== R. K Narayan ===
Rasipuram Krishnaswami Iyer Narayanaswami (also known as R. K Naranyan) is an Indian literary figure who was most famous for his work Malgudi. Malgudi is a fictional place created by Narayan that he wrote many novels set in. It was significant because it had an accurate historical record and its ongoing evolution, whereby Naranyan expressed his support to the Indian independence movement. Naranyan's style of literature aimed to depict modern Indian daily life, he did this through his characteristic simplistic, graceful and humorous approach. Narayan is also recognised for allowing Indian literature to a global stage, due to his translations of his novels into English, the Western World was given an insight into the life of the average Indian individual. Narayan received many awards during his career, the most significant being the National Prize of the Indian Literary Academy in 1958 and the Padma Vibushan, the second highest honour for civilians in 2000.
