= Ambedkar: A Life =

2022 book by Shashi Tharoor

- Author: Shashi Tharoor
- Language: English
- Publisher: Aleph Book Company
- Publication date: 1 October 2022
- Publication place: India
- Media type: Print (hardback)
- Pages: 226
- ISBN: 978-9391047504

Ambedkar: A Life is a book about B. R. Ambedkar written by the senior leader of the Indian National Congress, Shashi Tharoor. The book is divided into two parts, first part containing the initial phases of his life and Second part explains his life in Indian politics. It was published on 1 October 2022 by Aleph Book Company.

== Critical reception ==
G. Sampath of The Hindu wrote "it opens your spirit to the pain of another as they perceive it. This is perhaps the missing element in what is nonetheless an engaging introduction to Ambedkar’s life and legacy". Rishi Raj of The Financial Express says "well argued and provides a good critique of the man and will definitely come in handy for students researching Ambedkar". Raja Sekhar Vundru of The Tribune wrote "‘Ambedkar’ cannot be reduced to a fast-paced biography but is an eye-opener for many decades to come till India finds its social equality". Parsa Venkateshwar Rao Jr. of Deccan Chronicle says "It is a rare model of an intellectual-politician. And that is why he remains an Olympian figure, distant from his followers and critics". Pushpesh Pant of The New Indian Express wrote "This is followed by a section that looks at Ambedkar in contemporary times, but is once again, a condensation, albeit remarkable, of other writers’ works". K. Chandrakant of Loksatta wrote "This scholarly understanding of the visionary Dhurina who mirrors the 'reservation policy' is a must read".
