= The Sage Who Reimagined Hinduism =

2025 non-fiction book by Shashi Tharoor

- Author: Shashi Tharoor
- Language: English
- Subject: Narayana Guru
- Genre: Biography
- Publisher: Aleph Book Company
- Publication date: 15 December 2025
- Publication place: India
- Media type: Print
- Pages: 336
- ISBN: 978-93-6523-850-1

The Sage Who Reimagined Hinduism: The Life, Lessons, & Legacy of Sree Narayana Guru is a 2025 biography by Indian writer and politician Shashi Tharoor, published by Aleph Book Company. The book examines the life of Sree Narayana Guru (1855–1928), a spiritual leader and social reformer from Kerala who challenged caste hierarchy through temple reform and education.

== Summary ==
The book is in three parts: biography, philosophy, legacy. Tharoor starts with Aruvippuram in 1888, where Narayana Guru, an Ezhava, consecrated a Shiva lingam himself, something only Brahmins were then permitted to do. He covers the Guru's childhood in Chempazhanthy, his drift toward asceticism, and the founding of the Sree Narayana Dharma Paripalana Yogam in 1903. The schools and temples opened under its banner admitted all castes. Tharoor treats the Vaikom Satyagraha (1924-25) and the Guru's correspondence with Gandhi, though some scholars have noted he gives short shrift to the Guru's critics within the Ezhava community itself.
