= Southern literature (disambiguation) =

Southern literature is Southern United States literature. Southern literature can also refer to:

- Sangam literature, literature from Tamilakam, ancient southern India
- Occitan literature, from southern France, mostly in Occitan
- South African literature
- South Korean literature
- South Asian literature
