= A for Prayagraj =

Biographical account of Prayagraj

- Author: Udbhav Agarwal
- Language: Indian English
- Subject: Historical, Biographical
- Genre: Non-fiction
- Published: 10th August, 2021
- Publisher: Aleph Book Company
- Publication place: India
- Pages: 128
- ISBN: 9789390652723

A for Prayagraj is a 2021 book by Indian writer Udbhav Agarwal. Udbhav is a PhD candidate at Johns Hopkins University in Baltimore, Maryland, and previously completed his schooling at the Doon School and his undergraduate degree at the Vassar College in Poughkeepsie, New York. This is his first book, providing a biographical account of Prayagraj, formerly known as Allahabad, and its eventual name change.

== Summary ==
A for Prayagraj is part travelogue and part memoir, portraying various stories of the erstwhile Allahabad through the eyes of a former resident. The author, born and raised in the city revisits his childhood memories throughout the book. Over the span of 128 pages, he meets various people such as lawyers, theatre artists, and former and current residents to share with readers stories that have been lost to time. He describes how the city has transformed over the years. The book explores various subcultures in the city, along with its vices such as crime and street law. It also delves into other aspects, including education and unemployment. Throughout the book, we learn how one of India’s oldest cities, with a past both glorious and grim, is rapidly undergoing urbanization. From 'tent city' to the holy rivers, from crime to romance, the author covers every aspect of Prayagraj. This rapid change is, in the words of the author, rendering years of historical importance into 'a battleground of historical clichés.' Yet, as we find in the book, traces of the city’s glorious past still remain, both in its landscape and in the hearts and minds of its residents. This biography of Allahabad tells the modern story of an ancient city.

== Reception ==
Kinshuk Gupta of the Hindustan Times commented on the book, saying "Udbhav Agarwal’s precise detailing brings forth Allahabad-Prayagraj’s contradictions, its past slowly pushed to the corner by bustling malls even as its residents jostle hard to move out."

Alok Rai of India Today stated, "Allahabad might have changed its name, but a new book shows that the iconoclastic spirit of its youth remains resolute."
