= Show Business (novel) =

Book by Shashi Tharoor

- First edition
- Author: Shashi Tharoor
- Language: English
- Genre: Parody, Satirical, Postmodern novel with elements of Roman à clef,
- Publisher: Penguin Books India
- Publication date: 1992
- Publication place: India
- Media type: Print (Hardback & Paperback)
- Pages: 310 pp (first edition, paperback)
- ISBN: 0-14-015464-7 (first edition, paperback)
- OCLC: 426050815
- Preceded by: The Great Indian Novel(1989)
- Followed by: Riot (2001)

Show Business is a postmodern satirical novel by Shashi Tharoor.

== Plot introduction ==
Show Business parodies and satirises formulaic Bollywood cinema, using it as a metaphor in an attempt to raise and answer questions about contemporary India and Indians. It is a fictional work that tells the story of Ashok Banjara, a Bollywood superstar. Ashok Banjara is critically injured while shooting for a film and his entire life in Bollywood flashes in front of his eyes as he lies suspended between life and death in a hospital. The character and many incidents of Ashok Banjara's life are inspired by that of Amitabh Bachchan, the biggest superstar in Bollywood's history.

=== Explanation of the novel's title ===
The novel describes the working of Bollywood (India's Hindi film industry) and the career of a fictional superstar in this "Showbusiness." The author has explained in numerous interviews that the title refers not only to Bollywood but also to politics (which the protagonist joins) and to religion (as practised by one of the characters, a Guru to the stars), both of which are also forms of "show business", selling illusions to the public.

== Plot summary ==
Show Business begins with Ashok Banjara, a superstar in Bollywood, fighting for his life in the intensive care unit of a hospital after an accident on the sets of a film that he is shooting. Suspended between life and death he sees his entire life in Bollywood flashing in front of his eyes like a film. Details of Banjara's career in Bollywood are revealed primarily in flashback.

A young Ashok Banjara leaves Delhi and comes to Bombay to make his fortune and find fame in Bollywood. He achieves the big league with his second film Godambo that establishes him as an action star. Soon Banjara is known for playing the role of an angry young man fighting for the poor and the helpless against the establishment. A successful Ashok Banjara marries Maya, a talented co-star and convinces her to stay away from films for the sake of the family. Banjara, though is something of a philanderer, bedding most of his heroines. The actress Mehnaz Elahi becomes his mistress.

At the pinnacle of his success as a Bollywood star, Banjara is enticed to join politics and he wins the election easily (from his politician father's constituency). However, to his dismay, he finds that the party has no significant role for him and he languishes in the back benches in the parliament. Meanwhile, Banjara makes a film, Mechanic. This film is Banjara's first flop.

Sometime later Banjara is implicated in a money-laundering scandal. His party extricates him by saying that he is irrelevant in the party's scheme of things. Banjara quits politics. The scandal has destroyed his fortune and Banjara finds that he has to seek work again. With no mainstream director or producer ready to cast him now, in desperation Banjara agrees to work in a mythological film (he hates mythological) called Kalki. It is on the sets of Kalki that Banjara meets his accident. Fate is not without its sense of irony. Kalki is supposed to be Banjara's comeback vehicle - one that will restore his fortunes and once again establish him solidly with his audience. Banjara's accident on the sets of Kalki sees an audience of hundreds gathered outside the hospital waiting for news on his health. Millions of others praying for his recovery from their homes.

== Narrative structure of Show Business ==
Show Business has an intricate narrative structure which in many ways apes the structure of a Hindi blockbuster. The narrative of Show Business begins in medias res, and the story is revealed in a series of flashbacks by the novel's protagonist Banjara. These flashbacks are punctuated with monologues by the co-stars of Banjara's films and his life. This narrative is further peppered with tongue-in-cheek summaries of the superstar's movies. It is through these fragmented flashback that the narrative tells us the story of Ashok Banjara. In doing this, Show Business follows the postmodern technique of having multiple voices and a fractured chronology to tell a story. The film summaries allow the author to pass satirical comments on Bollywood and parody formulaic Bollywood films.

The novel reflects this structure by narrating the story in six parts that it calls "takes." Every "take" follows a similar internal (chapter) structure.

== Characters in Show Business ==
Some actors from Bollywood can be directly correlated to characters in the book. Other characters can be correlated with more general archetypal references especially in the context of formulaic Bollywood films.

Ashok Banjara, the protagonist of Show Business can be correlated to Amitabh Bachchan, Bollywood's biggest star till date. The characterisation of Banjara is that of a typical Bollywood megastar and protagonist.

Maya Kumari, Ashok Banjara's wife, can be correlated to Jaya Bhaduri, a popular Bollywood actress of yesteryears and Amitabh Bachchan's wife. In the novel, Maya is the archetypal dutiful wife and daughter-in-law of Hindi films.

Mehnaz Elahi, Ashok Banjara's mistress can be correlated to Parveen Babi and Rekha, both very popular Bollywood actresses whom Amitabh Bachchan was rumoured to have had affairs with. In the novel Mehnaz Elahi is characterised as a vainglorious and self-absorbed mistress.

Pranay, is a typical Bollywood villain and the archetypal friend with a heart of gold. He loves Maya and later has an affair with her.

Ashwin is Ashok Banjara's brother.

The Cheetah is a film magazine gossip columnist.

Kulbhushan, is Ashok Banjara's father who doesn't approve of his son's doings.
