= Network of Indian Professionals =

Non-profit organization

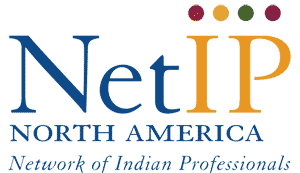
NetIP Logo.

The Network of Indian Professionals of North America (NetIP) is a non-profit organization for South Asian professionals.

NetIP was founded in 1990, by Dr. Satish Chandra in Chicago, IL. Since 1990, NetIP has grown to 24 chapters in North America and reach over 50,000 people with its activities and programs.

NetIP has 24 chartered chapters: Atlanta, Austin, Boston, Chicago, Columbus, Dallas, Denver, Houston, Los Angeles - Orange County, Miami, Detroit, New York, Charlotte, Ottawa, Philadelphia, Phoenix, Pittsburgh, San Diego, San Francisco - Bay Area, Seattle, St. Louis, Toronto, Minneapolis - St. Paul, and Washington D.C. It is partnered with numerous nonprofit organizations including TiE, One Laptop per Child, and TeachAids.

NetIP's New York Chapter has awarded the Excelsior Awards to notable individuals. These include Shashi Tharoor, Desh Deshpande, and Bobby Jindal. Sreenath Sreenivasan presented one such award.
