= Tharoorosaurus =

Book by Shashi Tharoor

- Author: Shashi Tharoor
- Publisher: Penguin Random House India Private Ltd.
- Publication date: September 1 2020
- Pages: 336
- ISBN: 978-9-35-305951-4

Tharoorosaurus is a book by Shashi Tharoor which was published on 1 September 2020 by Penguin Random House.

== Composition ==
The book is written in style of thesaurus and the definition of the book is ‘Aptagrams’. Shashi Tharoor shares 53 examples from his vocabulary which all are introduced by him.

== Critical reviews ==
K. C. Vijaya Kumar of The Hindu wrote:

There is a hat-tip to William Shakespeare — ‘His written vocabulary, Dickson tells us, consisted of 17,245 words, many of which he simply made up for his plays’, but this book isn’t entirely about literature. It liberally draws from the globe around us, juxtaposes the past with current realities, makes some friendly jabs at rival politicians and ideologies but never loses focus upon the specific word being dealt with and its multiple connotations.

The Times of India wrote:

The book is great for linguaphiles of any age and good for anyone who needs to understand the beauty of language and the way it constantly evolves.".

The book has been also reviewed by Ajay Kumar Singh of Daily Pioneer, and Gaurav Prakash of The News Agency.
