= Upworldly Mobile =

2011 non-fiction book by Ranjini Manian

- First edition
- Author: Ranjini Manian
- Cover artist: Pascal Reynaud
- Language: English
- Publisher: Penguin Books India
- Publication date: September 2011
- Publication place: India
- ISBN: 978-0-14-306803-7

Upworldly Mobile: Behaviour and Business Skills for the New Indian manager is the second book by Indian author Ranjini Manian published by Penguin Books India in September 2011. The book targets young Indian professionals, trying to prepare them with global business insights for cross-cultural encounters.

The book aims to provide practical tips for young Indian professionals interacting with foreign cultures. The content includes greeting rituals, networking and communication tips, as well as country-specific do's and don'ts.

The foreword was written by the Indian politician and Member of Parliament Dr. Shashi Tharoor.

== Author ==
Ranjini Manian is currently Chief Executive Officer of Global Adjustments Pvt. Ltd., an Indian company focused on relocation and cross-cultural training of expatriates. She is the editor of the cultural magazine Culturama, and a writer and speaker at Indian and international forums. Her first book was Doing Business in India for Dummies, published by Penguin Books. She is a regular columnist in The Hindu Business Line teaching behavioral skills to new Indian managers.

She has a bachelor's degree in Psychology and French literature from the Elphinstone College in Mumbai and a Diploma in French Civilization from the University of Sorbonne, Paris. She is certified in Mastering Negotiations from Harvard University.

She served at the leadership board of the Harvard Kennedy School.
