= The Paradoxical Prime Minister =

2018 book by Shashi Tharoor

- First edition cover
- Author: Shashi Tharoor
- Language: English
- Subject: Nonfiction
- Publisher: Aleph Book Company
- Publication date: 26 October 2018
- Publication place: India
- Media type: Print (hardcover)
- Pages: 504
- ISBN: 9789388292177

The Paradoxical Prime Minister: Narendra Modi And His India is a 2018 nonfiction book written by the senior leader of the Indian National Congress, Shashi Tharoor, about the Prime Minister of India, Narendra Modi. The book was released on 26 October 2018 by Manmohan Singh, P. Chidambaram, Arun Shourie, and Pavan Varma.

In the book, Tharoor examines and questions the tenure of the Modi government. He states that his criticisms are based on "facts and figures", along with examples. Tharoor claims that he questions "the foreign policy, relationships in the neighbourhood, the priorities, the episodic nature of much of our foreign policy conduct, the inconsistent yo-yoing of [the] relationship with Pakistan, etc., etc." of Modi's tenure. The book was published by Aleph Book Company.

== Reception ==
Sudheendra Kulkarni, in his review of the book in The Hindu, wrote: "Tharoor is largely silent on the shortcomings of his own party's long, and not always praiseworthy, stints in governance. This has greatly contributed to the partisan nature of the book."

Saket Suman of Business Standard wrote in his review: "What Tharoor does, and succeeds in doing, is show his readers what Modi said and says, and what he and his government did during the four years of their rule so far."

Anirudh Madhavan of The Week wrote: "Tharoor echoes the sentiments of the many who oppose Modi, but does so with academic rigour."
