= Ishaan Tharoor =

Indian-American journalist (born 1984)

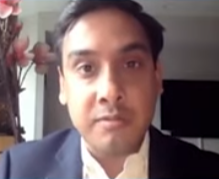
- Tharoor at the World Economic Forum in Davos, 2021
- Born: 22 June 1984 (age 42); KK Hospital, Singapore
- Citizenship: India (until 2020); United States (from 2020)
- Education: Yale University (B.A)
- Occupation: Journalist
- Spouse: Bhumika Davé Tharoor
- Parents: Shashi Tharoor (father); Tilottama Mukherji (mother)

Ishaan Tharoor (born 22 June 1984) is an American journalist and son of former diplomat and politician Shashi Tharoor. Tharoor is a former senior editor at Time magazine, and now writes on foreign affairs for The Washington Post. He is the author of the Today's WorldView newsletter and column. In 2021, he won the Arthur Ross Media Award in commentary from the American Academy of Diplomacy. He was previously based in Hong Kong and New York City. He also served as an Georgetown University adjunct professor at their Walsh School of Foreign Service for two years.

== Personal life ==
Tharoor, and his twin brother Kanishk, were born prematurely in 1984 at the KK Hospital in Singapore. He was raised in Geneva, Switzerland, but currently lives in Washington DC. He married Bhumika Davé Tharoor in 2017 and has children.

== Career ==
Tharoor’s nearly 12-year tenure at The Washington Post came to an end during a significant staff reduction that affected over 300 employees. Having joined the paper in 2014 after several years at Time magazine, Tharoor had become a prominent voice in international reporting, most notably for creating and writing the 'WorldView' column and newsletter starting in 2017. Following the announcement, Tharoor stated he was 'heartbroken' for the newsroom, marking the end of a decade-long period where he helped shape the paper's global analysis.
