= David Davidar =

Indian novelist and publisher

- Born: 27 September 1958 (age 68); Nagercoil, Tamilnadu
- Education: Madras Christian College, Harvard University
- Occupations: Novelist, publisher, former CEO of Penguin Group
- Spouse: Rachna Singh

David Davidar (born 27 September 1958) is an Indian novelist and publisher. He is the author of three published novels, The House of Blue Mangoes (2002), The Solitude of Emperors (2007), and Ithaca (2011). In parallel to his writing career, Davidar has been a publisher for over a quarter-century. He is the co-founder of Aleph Book Company, a literary publishing firm based in New Delhi.

== Personal life ==
David Davidar was born in Nagercoil, Kanyakumari district, in the South Indian state of Tamil Nadu. His father was a tea planter in Kerala, and his mother was a teacher. Davidar grew up in Kerala and Tamil Nadu, and both states feature prominently in his fiction. He has one sibling, Ruth Swamy, a nutritionist and dietician.

He attended Sainik School, Amaravathinagar, in Tiruppur district, and then earned a BSc degree in Botany from Madras Christian College in 1979. In 1985, he obtained a diploma in publishing from the Radcliffe Publishing Procedures Course at Harvard University.

Davidar has been married to Rachna Singh, a bookseller, since 1997. She has worked at The Bookshop in New Delhi, which her family owns, as well as at bookstores in Canada, among them, Nicholas Hoare, Ben McNally Books, and McNally Robinson.

== Journalistic career ==
Davidar began a career in journalism after graduating from college. His first job, in 1979, was with the Bombay-based activist magazine Himmat, which was founded by Rajmohan Gandhi, the grandson of Mahatma Gandhi. When that magazine closed down, Davidar joined a features magazine called Keynote, which was edited by the distinguished poet Dom Moraes, and his actress wife, Leela Naidu. His last job in journalism was with another features magazine called Gentleman where he was Executive Editor. In addition to his magazine career, Davidar was a columnist for the Hindu newspaper in the 1990s. He has also written numerous articles and book reviews for newspapers and magazines in India, the UK, and the US.

== Publishing career ==
In 1985, after obtaining his diploma in publishing, Davidar was hired by Peter Mayer, then chairman of the multinational publishing company Penguin as one of the founder members of Penguin India. As its first Editor, and later Publisher, Davidar edited or published a distinguished line-up of authors including Shashi Tharoor, Vikram Seth, Ruskin Bond, Kiran Desai, Romila Thapar, Rajmohan Gandhi, Arundhati Roy, Pavan K. Varma, Khushwant Singh, Vikram Chandra, Salman Rushdie, Dom Moraes, William Dalrymple, Damon Galgut, and Nandan Nilekani. In the course of his career with Penguin in India, Davidar held a variety of senior positions, among them, Publisher, Penguin India; CEO, Penguin India; Managing Director, Dorling Kindersley India; and CEO, Pearson India.

In 2004, he moved to Toronto, Canada, as Publisher, Penguin Canada, where the authors he published included Philip Roth, Khaled Hosseini, John Le Carre, Stieg Larsson, Nadine Gordimer, Alice Munro, Fatima Bhutto, Amitav Ghosh, Margaret Macmillan, Zadie Smith, Kim Echlin, Hisham Matar, Joseph Boyden, Adrienne Clarkson, and John Ralston Saul. In Toronto, the various positions he held at the company included the following: Publisher, Penguin Canada; CEO and Publisher, Penguin Canada; and CEO, Penguin International, a division of Penguin Books that comprised Penguin companies in Canada, India, South Africa, and the Middle East.

In 2010, a Penguin Canada staffer alleged in a lawsuit that Davidar sexually harassed her culminating in an outright assault in October 2009 at the Frankfurt Book Fair. The employee alleged that she was wrongfully dismissed from Penguin Canada when she complained about Davidar's conduct. The sexual harassment lawsuit was settled out of court, and the staffer was rehired by Penguin. Penguin asked Davidar to resign as Publisher.

In August 2010, he moved back to India from Toronto to co-found Aleph Book Company, in partnership with Rupa Publications India, one of the country's largest English-language trade publishers.

== Novelistic career ==
Davidar published short stories and poems in newspapers and literary magazines, before publishing his debut novel, The House of Blue Mangoes, in 2002. The novel, which was based on Davidar's own family, and covered fifty years of South Indian history, had been twelve years in the writing. It was greeted with acclaim throughout the English-speaking world and was eventually published in sixteen countries and translated into as many languages. Among the newspapers and magazines which praised the novel were The New York Times which called it "a polished and accomplished book", London's Sunday Times which thought it was "dazzling" and the San Francisco Chronicle which said Davidar was "an intriguing new voice".

Davidar's second novel, The Solitude of Emperors, which was based on his experiences as a journalist, and the outrage he felt at the communal riots that took place in India in the 1990s, was published in 2007, and was short-listed for a Commonwealth Writers Prize.

His third novel, Ithaca, set in the world of international publishing, was published in Fall 2011. It was praised by several newspapers; The Hindu said it provided "a fascinating insight into the world of publishing". In 2015, he edited an anthology of Indian short stories, A Clutch of Indian Masterpieces, that was widely acclaimed. The Hindu Business Line said: "The collection serves as a guide to Indian consciousness."

== Bibliography ==
- The House of Blue Mangoes (2002)
- The Solitude of Emperors (2007)
- Ithaca (2011)
- A Clutch of Indian Masterpieces (Ed) (2015)

== See also ==
- List of Indian writers
