= The Struggle for India's Soul =

2021 book by Shashi Tharoor

- Author: Shashi Tharoor
- Publisher: Hurst Publishers
- Publication date: 2021

The Struggle for India's Soul: Nationalism and the Fate of Democracy is a book by Shashi Tharoor which was published on 26 November 2021 by Hurst Publishers.

== Critical review ==
Tunku Varadarajan of The Wall Street Journal wrote "Where Mr. Tharoor’s book is at its weakest is in its absence of clear remedies or solutions, beyond well-meaning but somewhat trite assertions that India needs “a rearmed liberalism, with a mass movement for the restoration of our civic nationalism.” Reg Naulty of Rationale Magazine wrote "this book contains much wisdom", Arushi Ganguly of Australian Institute of International Affairs wrote "the book is enlightening for those who wish to gain critical insight into the ruling government of India." and Murali Kamma of New York Journal of Books wrote "In his sobering yet compelling book, Tharoor shows how in today’s India, where Hindu nationalists are firmly in power, a majoritarian mindset has supplanted the democratic mindset.”. The book has been reviewed by Maximillian Morch of Asian Review of Books and Reg Naulty of The Friend.
