= Nehru: The Invention of India =

2003 book by Shashi Tharoor

- First edition
- Author: Shashi Tharoor
- Language: English
- Subject: Non-fiction
- Publisher: Arcade Publishing
- Publication date: 2003
- Publication place: India
- Media type: Print (hardcover)
- ISBN: 9781559706971

Nehru: The Invention of India is a book written by Shashi Tharoor in 2003. It is a short biography that talks about the life of the first Prime Minister of India. It covers both personal aspects along with the historical and political aspects of India during the time of Pandit Nehru.

On 14 November 2018 on the occasion of Jawaharlal Nehru's birth anniversary, Tharoor announced that Nehru: The Invention of India will be remade into a web series.
