= The Five Dollar Smile =

Short story collection by Shashi Tharoor

- First edition cover
- Author: Shashi Tharoor
- Publisher: Viking Press
- Publication date: 1990

The Five Dollar Smile: And Other Stories is a short story collection by Indian politician Shashi Tharoor, published in 1990 by Viking Press. The stories collected were written in the author's late teens and initially published in various magazines and newspapers including JS, The Illustrated Weekly of India, Eve's Weekly, Youth Times, Gentleman, The New Review and Cosmopolitan.

== List of Stories ==
- "The Five-Dollar Smile"
- "The Boutique"
- "How Bobby Chatterjee Turned to Drink"
- "Village Girl, City Girl: A Duet"
- "The Temple Thief"
- "The Simple Man"
- "The Professor's Daughter"
- "Friends"
- "The Pyre"
- "The Political Murder"
- "The Other Man"
- "Auntie Rita"
- "The Solitude of the Short-Story Writer"
- "The Death of a Schoolmaster"
