= Inglorious Empire =

2017 non-fiction book by Shashi Tharoor

Inglorious Empire: What the British Did to India
- Indian edition
- Author: Shashi Tharoor
- Language: English
- Genre: History
- Publisher: Aleph (India); C. Hurst & Co. (UK)
- Publication date: March 2017
- ISBN: 978-1-84904-808-8 (hardcover)

Inglorious Empire: What the British Did to India, first published in India as An Era of Darkness: The British Empire in India, is a work of non-fiction by Shashi Tharoor, an Indian politician and diplomat, on the effects of British colonial rule on India. The book has received mixed reviews. In 2017, Tharoor won the 2017 Ramnath Goenka Excellence in Journalism Award and the 2019 Sahitya Akademi Award for this work.

== Background ==
Tharoor made a speech at a 2015 Oxford Union debate on the topic "Does Britain owe reparations to its former colonies?", which went viral over the web. Subsequently, his publisher floated the idea to transform the speech into a book; despite being initially skeptical, he went on to write a 330 page book.

== The Book ==
The following quote summarises the core theme of the book.

"Company official John Sullivan observed in the 1840s: 'The little court disappears - the capital decays - trade languishes - the capital decays - the people are impoverished - the Englishman flourishes, and acts like a sponge, drawing up riches from the banks of the Ganges, and squeezing them down upon the banks of the Thames'. India that the British East India Company conquered was no primitive or barren land, but the glittering jewel of the medieval world. Its accomplishments and prosperity - 'the wealth created by vast and varied industries' - were succinctly described by a Yorkshire-born American Unitarian minister, J. T. Sunderland. At the beginning of eighteenth century, as the British economic historian Angus Maddison has demonstrated, India's share of world economy was 23 per cent, as large as all of Europe put together. By the time the British departed India, it had dropped to just over 3 per cent. The reason was simple: India was governed for the benefit of Britain. Britain's rise for 200 years was financed by its depredation in India."

— Shashi Tharoor, The Looting of India, Inglorious Empire: What the British Did to India (2017)

== Reception ==
The Hindu Business Line called the book "one breathless read". The Guardian called it a "passionately argued book [which] provides a crushing rebuttal of such ideas with regard to India".

Tabish Khair praised the book for presenting an "intricate mixture of fact and anecdotes" that served as an effective counter to the view of "colonial apologists" but at the same time, did praise the British, when it merited.

Eminent Scottish historian William Dalrymple criticised the book, saying it "was written in 12 days, involved no personal archive research and contains some serious factual errors" however he maintained that the book was, nevertheless, "persuasive".

In a review published in the Cambridge Review of International Affairs, economic historian, Tirthankar Roy, a faculty at the London School of Economics criticized the book. He noted that "Tharoor makes his case with passion and plain good writing. The story is meant to be "blood-curdling and colourful language" — including liberal use of "depredation," "loot," "rapaciousness," "vicious," "brutality," "plunder" and "extraction" — produces that effect. Like a religious text, it tells a straight and narrow story with the zeal of a holy warrior. Yet "none of these qualities makes the interpretation right, however".

Another review of Inglorious Empire, published in the Literary Review, by historian John Keay, whose many writings on India include India: A History, applauds Tharoor for "tackling an impossibly contentious subject". However, he deplores the fact that "his moral venom sometimes clouds his own judgement" and notes that many of Tharoor's statistics are very seriously out of date, many coming from the polemics contained in the American Will Durant's Story of Civilisation written in the 1930s, which itself drew on the even earlier work of the crusading American missionary Jabej T. Sutherland, author of India in Bondage.

A more detailed criticism of Tharoor's book and his use of statistics was set out by the writer of South Asian history Charles Allen in a lecture entitled Quis custodiet ipsos custodes: who owns Indian history? delivered to the Royal Society for Asian Affairs in London on 25 April 2018. A revised version was published in Asian Affairs under the revised title Who Owns India's History? A Critique of Shashi Tharoor's Inglorious Empire.
