= India: From Midnight to the Millennium =

1997 book by Shashi Tharoor

- First edition
- Author: Shashi Tharoor
- Genre: Non-fiction
- Publisher: Viking Books
- Publication date: 1997

India: From Midnight to the Millennium is a book written by Shashi Tharoor in 1997. It discusses a wide range of topics like caste, democracy in India, Indira Gandhi, the partition of India, and its transition from a socialist economy to a free market economy.

Shashi Tharoor argues compellingly that India stands at the intersection of the most significant questions facing the world at the end of the twentieth century. If democracy leads to inefficient political infighting, should it be sacrificed in the interest of economic well-being? Does religious fundamentalism provide a way for countries in the developing world to assert their identity in the face of western hegemony, or is there a case for pluralism and diversity amid cultural and religious traditions? Does the entry of Western consumer goods threaten a country's economic self-sufficiency, and is protectionism the only guarantee of independence? The answers to such questions will determine what kind of world the next century will bring, and since Indians will soon account for a sixth of the world's population, their choices will have repercussions throughout the globe.
