= The Great Indian Novel =

Book by Shashi Tharoor

- Author: Shashi Tharoor
- Language: English
- Genre: Roman à clef, Satirical, Historical novel
- Publisher: Viking Press
- Publication date: 24 August 1989
- Publication place: India
- Media type: Print (hardback & paperback)
- Pages: 384 (first edition, hardback)
- ISBN: 0-670-82744-4 (first edition, hardback)
- OCLC: 24069762
- Dewey Decimal: 823 20
- LC Class: PR9499.3.T535 G7 1989c
- Followed by: Show Business (1992)

The Great Indian Novel is a satirical novel by Shashi Tharoor, first published by Viking Press in 1989. It is a fictional work that takes the story of the Mahabharata, the Indian epic, and recasts and resets it in the context of the Indian independence movement and the first three decades post-independence. Figures from Indian history are transformed into characters from mythology, and the mythical story of India is retold as a history of Indian independence and subsequent history, up through the 1970s. Some critics have identified an element of subversion in the novel. The work includes numerous puns and allusions to famous works about India, such as those by Rudyard Kipling, Paul Scott, and E. M. Forster.

The Mahabharata is an epic tale describing the historical dynastic struggle over the throne of the kingdom of Hastinapur between the Pandavas and the Kauravas, two branches of the heirs of the King Shantanu. In his novel, Tharoor recasts the story of the nascent Indian democracy as a struggle between groups and individuals closely related by their personal and political histories. Through his cantankerous narrator, Tharoor takes an irreverent tone towards figures such as Mohandas Gandhi and Jawaharlal Nehru, who are ordinarily treated with reverence by Indians.

The phrase "great Indian novel" is an allusion to the long-standing idea of the "Great American Novel" and is also a pun, roughly translating "Mahabharata" (maha "great"; Bharata "India"). The Mahabharata, which is not a novel but an epic poem, can be understood, according to Tharoor, to represent Hinduism's greatest literary achievement and thus serves as an appropriate paradigm in which to frame a retelling of recent Indian history.

A significant characteristic of Tharoor's version of the story is the emphasis on the older generations (e.g., Bhishma, Dhritarashtra, and Pandu) and the resulting de-emphasis on the actions of the Kauravas and the Pandavas.

== Plot summary ==
The organisation of the sections and chapters of the novel mirrors the organisation of the Mahabharata and the themes and events addressed in each allude to themes and events of the mirrored sections of the epic. The novel has 18 "books," just as the Mahabharata has 18 books and the Battle of Kurukshetra lasted for 18 days.

=== The First Book:- The Twice-Born Tale ===
Up to some extent a counterpart to the Mahabharata's "Book of the Beginning."

In this section, Ved Vyas ("V.V."), the narrator, recounts his personal history; the seduction of Satyavati by the Brahmin Parashar and his own birth; the origin of Dev Datta from the union of Shantanu and the now absent Maharanee (whom he met on the banks of the Ganga (Ganges) and who had had seven suspicious miscarriages); the marriage of Shantanu and Satyavati and Dev Datta's vow of chastity; the birth of Chitrangada and Vichitravirya and the latter's marriage; Ved Vyas's insemination of Ambika and Ambalika; the vow of revenge against Dev Datta taken by Amba; the birth of Dhritarashtra and Pandu; and the assignment of Ganapathi by Brahm's Apsara Agency to transcribe Ved Vyas's memoir, which V.V. describes as the "Song of Modern India."

=== The Second Book:- The Duel With the Crown ===
Counterpart to the Mahabharata's "Book of the Assembly Hall." The title of this section alludes to Paul Scott's The Jewel in the Crown. Ved Vyas also compares his memoir to The Autobiography of an Unknown Indian by Nirad Chaudhuri. The British resident's equerry is named "Heaslop," an allusion to a character in A Passage to India.

Introduced is the character of Sir Richard, the British resident at Hastinapur, who is complaining about the increasing radicalisation of Ganga Datta, who is still serving as regent of Hastinapur. Ved Vyas discusses the upbringing of Dhritarashtra, Pandu, and Vidur Dharmaputra under the care of the regent, Ganga Datta.

Discovering the suffering of the people of Motihari, Ganga Datta embarks on his first protest campaign. Gangaji is arrested and he pleads guilty to defying a police order, but his action results in a victory for the peasants of Motihari.

=== The Third Book:- The Rains Came ===
Counterpart to the Mahabharata's "Book of the Forest." The title of this section alludes to Louis Bromfield's The Rains Came.

Sir Richard is furious about the events of Motihari and Heaslop notes that Gangaji had never formally resigned from the regency of Hastinapur. The regent having committed sedition, Hastinapur can now be annexed by British India.

Dhritarashtra and Gandhari's marriage is off to a good start. The devoted young bride has resolved to forever covering her eyes with a blindfold so that she is deprived of whatever her husband is deprived of. Pandu is also enjoying his two sexually expert wives. While enjoying sexual congress with both at once, he suffers a "massive coronary thrombosis" and is prohibited from ever again engaging in sexual intercourse. Pandu joins Gangaji's movement and instructs his wives to seek other sexual partners so that they may still bear him heirs. Kunti reveals that in her youth she bore Hyperion Helios's child but sent the baby boy down the river in a basket.

Gandhari the Grim gives birth not to a hundred sons, but to one daughter, Priya Duryodhani, who is to be the equivalent of a thousand sons.

=== The Fourth Book:- A Raj Quartet ===
Counterpart to the Mahabharata's "Book of Virata." The title of this section alludes to Paul Scott's Raj Quartet.

Hastinapur is annexed to the British Presidency of Marabar (an allusion to the "Marabar Caves," which figure prominently in A Passage to India). The people of Hastinapur are milling in the streets, threatening revolt. There is a rumour that Gangaji will address a rally at the Bibighar Gardens (an allusion to the "Bibighar," which figures prominently in A Jewel in the Crown). Heaslop counsels Sir Richard to let passions dissipate on their own, but Sir Richard instead calls in Colonel Rudyard and the Fifth Baluch, which starts firing on the unarmed gathering in the Bibighar Gardens. Almost 400 people are killed and more than a thousand are injured.

After the Bibighar Gardens Massacre, Colonel Rudyard is retired with a half-million pound pension. An unnamed Nobel Prize-winning poet (an allusion to Rabindranath Tagore) returns his knighthood. Gangaji kicks off the Quit India Movement (an allusion to the Quit India Movement started by Mahatma Gandhi). Bungling assassins kill a Professor Kipling instead of Colonel Rudyard. This Professor Kipling was the racist teacher whom a young Pandu had struck, resulting in the end of Pandu's formal education.

Vidur resigns from the civil service but Gangaji and Dhritarashtra order him to rescind his resignation. Dhritarashtra becomes head of the Kaurava Party and Pandu becomes the party's chief organiser.

Kunti bears the sons of Dharma (a young magistrate), Major Vayu of the palace guard, and Devendra Yogi: Yudhistir, Bhim the Brave, and Arjun. Exhausted, Kunti calls a halt to the cuckolding and Madri begs to be permitted to take up the torch. She has an affair with the twins Ashvin and Ashwin and bears the twin sons Nakul and Sahadev.

=== The Fifth Book:- The Powers of Silence ===
Counterpart to the Mahabharata's "Book of War Preparations." The title of this section alludes to Paul Scott's The Towers of Silence.

During an epidemic, a Sarah Moore persuades her brother, the manager of a jute mill in Budge Budge, near Calcutta, to offer the mill workers a bonus. After the epidemic, the workers refuse to give up the bonus and are locked out. Sarahbehn enlists Gangaji's aid and Gangaji embarks on his first protest fast. The British Raj directs the Mill Owners' Association to give in.

=== The Sixth Book:- Forbidden Fruit ===
Counterpart to the Mahabharata's "Book of Bhishma."

A rift begins to develop between Dhritarashtra and Pandu, both working within the Kaurava Party to further the cause of Indian independence, with Pandu advocating a harder line than that pursued by Gangaji and Dhritarashtra. Gangaji attends the Round Table Conference hosted by the British government. Mahadeva Menon, a Kaurava Party official from Palghat, persuades Gangaji to do something about the tax on mangoes. Gangaji kicks off the Great Mango March, which prompts Pandu to leave the Kaurava Party.

In Chaurasta, a Kaurava protest turns violent and Gangaji calls off the mango agitation. Gangaji is called for a meeting with the viceroy and entertains an uncomfortable Sir Richard with the tale of why he drinks goat's milk instead of cow's milk.

=== The Seventh Book:- The Son Also Rises ===
Counterpart to the Mahabharata's "Book of Drona." The title of this section alludes to Ernest Hemingway's The Sun Also Rises.

Ved Vyas describes the divisions in Indian society and their engenderment by colonial policies, and the formation of the Muslim Group under the figurehead leadership of the Gaga Shah, an "overweight sybarite." The arrogant and (literally) brilliant Mohammed Ali Karna, the son of Kunti and Hyperion Helios, educated by the generosity of Indra Deva, the employer of Karna's adoptive father, rises to prominence as a lawyer and as a member of the Kaurava Party. Dhritarashtra insults Karna upon discovering that his (adoptive) father is a chauffeur. Kunti sees Karna and realises that he is her firstborn son. The story is told of how Indra Deva gave him the surname "Karna," the "Hacker-Off," after Karna circumcised himself with a knife. Karna leaves the movement and goes to England, but the Gaga Shah invites Karna back to India to lead the Muslim Group.

=== The Eighth Book:- Midnight's Parents ===
Counterpart to the Mahabharata's "Book of Karna." The title of this section alludes to Salman Rushdie's Midnight's Children.

The five Pandavas and Priya Duryodhani grow up, each revealing their characters. Priya tries and fails to poison and drown her cousin Bhim. While playing cricket, the Pandavas meet the sage Jayaprakash Drona who tells the tale of his son, Ashwathaman, and his insult at the hands of Ronald Heaslop, which led him to his mission of educating young Indians to facilitate the overthrow of the British. The Pandavas choose Drona to be their tutor.

Pandu decides to seek the presidency of the Kaurava Party and Dhritarashtra fears that there is a good chance he will lose the election to Pandu. Gangaji persuades Dhritarashtra to step down in favour of a less prominent figure, and untouchable. Thus, if Pandu wins the election, then Gangaji and Dhritarashtra will not be seen as having suffered a defeat.

=== The Ninth Book:- Him – Or, the Far Power-Villain ===
Counterpart to the Mahabharata's "Book of Shalya." The title of this section alludes to Rudyard Kipling's Kim and to M. M. Kaye's The Far Pavilions.

Pandu is elected president of the Kaurava Party and a struggle begins between him and Gangaji for control over the direction of the party. Gangaji outmanoeuvres Pandu, who loses a vote of confidence and resigns.

Ved Vyas switches to verse to tell Pandu's story. Pandu forms the Onward Organisation (an allusion to the All India Forward Bloc), the OO. Pandu allies himself with the Germans and the Japanese against the British and forms the Swatantra Sena (an allusion to the Indian National Army formed by Subhas Chandra Bose) to fight against British forces on the Burmese front. Pandu sends for Madri to join him and the sight of her wearing a military uniform begins to break down his control over his carnal desires. While fleeing from defeat in Singapore by air, Pandu and Madri succumb to their passion. Pandu dies of a heart attack and the plane is shot down, killing Madri as well.

=== The Tenth Book:- Darkness at Dawn ===
Counterpart to the Mahabharata's "Book of the Sleeping Warriors." – title may be an allusion to Arthur Koestler's Darkness at Noon

Ashwathaman joins the Pandavas as the students of Drona in the military, terroristic, and nationalistic arts. When Arjun has to share an academic prize with Ekalavya, the son of a maidservant, Ekalavya admits that he has been sharing in the Pandavas' lessons while standing outside the door. In exchange for payment for his tuition, Drona demands that Ekalavya cut off his own right thumb and give it to Drona. Unlike in the original Mahabharata, Tharoor's Ekalavya refuses and flees in horror. Drona has a good laugh.

Karna considers his options after the Muslim Group's candidates are bested by Muslim members of the Kaurava Party in the elections. Karna proposes a coalition government in the legislative assembly of the Northern Province. Vidur urges Dhritarashtra to accept Karna's proposal, even though the Kaurava Party controls enough seats in the Northern Province to rule without a coalition. Mohammed Rafi, a Muslim Kauravaman, urges rejection of Karna's offer and Dhritarashtra and Gangaji concede. Karna is resolved to find other means of gaining power.

The viceroy and Sir Richard consider what to do in reaction to the initiation of the Second World War. Sir Richard relates the story of Sir Francis Younghusband, who inadvertently annexed Tibet. ("He'd really intended just to see the tourist spots and to get a few good pictures of the Potala Palace, but one of his rifles went off accidentally and when he then saw all the notables on their knees cowering he couldn't really disappoint them by not conquering them.") Sir Richard persuades the viceroy to declare war on Germany without consulting the elected governments of the provinces.

Kaurava Party legislators react to the declaration of war by resigning en masse. The absence of the Kaurava Party in the administration benefits the Muslim Group, which takes over the government in three provinces. Gangaji initiates the Quit India Movement and the leaders of the Kaurava Party are imprisoned. The emboldened Muslim Group begins calling for a separate Muslim state, to be called Karnistan (the "Hacked-Off Land").

Amba, planning her revenge on Gangaji, goes to a plastic surgeon for a sex-change operation.

Following the end of the war, the Kaurava Party does well in the election, but the Muslim Group's strength is not diminished. The British government charges with treason the soldiers who joined Pandu's Swatantra Sena. Viscount Bertie Drewpad is appointed viceroy. His wife, Georgina, is excited at the prospect of dallying with lusty Indian men.

While Dhritarashtra plans to meet the new viceroy, his wife, Gandhari the Grim, lies dying, calling Priya Duryodhani her "son."

=== The Eleventh Book:- Renunciation – Or, the Bed of Arrows ===
Counterpart to the Mahabharata's "Book of the Women." Lord Drewpad announces the British intent to withdraw from India on Aug, 15, 1947, to Dhritarashtra, Mohammed Rafi, Ved Vyas, Sardar Khushkismat Singh, and Karna. Dhritarashtra and the Kaurava Party agree to the Partition of India. A Mr. Nichols is assigned to draw the border between the two new countries, to the derision of an experienced administrator named Basham. Vidur assists the viceroy in making decisions related to the transfer of power.

Gangaji initiates an experiment in eliminating sexual desire by inviting Sarah-behn to sleep in his bed. While violence tears India apart, Dhritarashtra initiates an affair with Lady Drewpad. While India celebrates independence, Amba, now Shikhandin the Godless, assassinates Gangaji.

=== The Twelfth Book:- The Man Who Could Not Be King ===
Counterpart to the Mahabharata's "Book of Peace." The title of this section alludes to Rudyard Kipling's The Man Who Would Be King. Ved Vyas refers to "Children being born at inconvenient times of the night who would go on to label a generation and rejuvenate a literature," which alludes to Rushdie's Midnight's Children. Drona's secretary is called Sir Beverley Twitty, K.C.M.G.

Jayaprakash Drona, now serving as Minister of State for Administrative Reform, gets his opportunity for revenge against Ronald Heaslop, who has lost everything in the rioting. Drona, instead of answering Heaslop's long-ago refusal to help him with co-ordinate cruelty, he offers Heaslop a job.

Georgina Drewpad's affair with Dhritarashtra (now prime minister of India) continues. On 26 January 1950, the day India becomes a republic, she gives birth to a daughter, who is given up for adoption and given the name Draupadi Mokrasi.

Vyabhichar Singh ("Mr. Z"), the maharaja of Manimir, tries to avoid acceding either to India or Karnistan. Mohammed Rafi urges Dhritarashtra to ensure that Manimir remains part of India. Vidur, now Principal Secretary for Integration, counsels patience, hoping that Sheikh Azharuddin, a Kaurava ally, might be able to overthrow Mr. Z. Dhritarashtra decides to let Karna, now governor-general of Karnistan, make the first move, which he does, leaving the Indian government the perfect excuse to send in Khushkismat Singh, the Minister of Defence, with Indian troops. Vidur goes to Devpur to get Vyabhichar Singh to sign the instrument of accession, and persuades Colonel Bewakuf Jan to disturb the maharaja from his sporting with a Frenchwoman. Vidur states his case while the maharaja is fellated under an "enormous silk razai." The maharaja is finally persuaded to sign by his companion, "a steatopygous blonde wearing nothing but a look of panic." Vidur helps the maharaja flee to Marmu, his winter capital.

The Pathans invading Manimir get drunk and the Indian Army parachutes into Devpur. Dhritarashtra snatches defeat from the jaws of victory by halting the Indian Army's advance and calling in the United Nations.

Professor Jennings delivers a critique of his student, D. Mokrasi.

=== The Thirteenth Book:- Passages Through India ===
Counterpart to the Mahabharata's "Book of Bhishma's Final Instructions." The title of this section alludes to E. M. Forster's A Passage to India.

Drona decides to resign from government and do "constructive work" in rural areas, taking Ashwathaman with him. The five Pandavas they also want to go along and break the news to Kunti, their chain-smoking and still glamorous mother. To secure her blessing, Yudhishtir promises never to disobey his mother.

Dhritarashtra consults Kanika, regarding what he should do about the increasing popularity of Drona and the Pandavas. Kanika counsels Dhritarashtra not to allow the Pandavas to attain too much political power, but Dhritarashtra is too idealistic to take the advice. Priya Duryodhani, however, is listening and she takes Kanika's advice seriously.

Vidur, now Secretary of the Home Ministry and head of the Central Bureau of Intelligence, goes to a Drona land reform rally to warn the Pandavas that Priya Duryodhani is plotting against them. Vidur arranges for the Pandavas to hide out in Varanavata with Kunti.

Karna, who has not been well, dies when he tries to pull a car out of the mud with his bare hands. Kunti, hearing the news, repeats her firstborn son's final gesture—by shaking her fist at the sun.

=== The Fourteenth Book:- The Rigged Veda ===
Counterpart to the Mahabharata's "Book of the Horse Sacrifice." The title of this section alludes to the Hindu sacred work the Rig Veda.

Purochan Lal, the owner of the hotel where Kunti is staying, is an agent of Priya Duryodhani. Vidur intercepts the cables and sends a coded message explaining that the house is coated with lac and will be set fire. The building is burnt, but Vidur arranges their escape while letting the world believe they have perished in the fire.

Vidur tells Dhritarashtra about a joke by Winston Churchill botched by Khushkismat Singh. After discussing the Manimir situation, Dhritarashtra appoints Kanika to replace Singh as Minister of Defence.

The Pandavas wander India sticking up for the rights of the downtrodden. The refuse to take sides between two corrupt landlords, Pinaka and Saranga (whose men attacked a man named Hangari Das).

Dhritarashtra and Kanika start the "non-aligned" movement. They decide to annexe the Portuguese colony of Comea.

Bhim saves a beautiful girl from her abusive brother, Hidimba ("a large man with a small goatee"), and weds.

The Chairman of the People's Republic of Chakra, watching the annexation of Comea by India, orders the Chakar People's Liberation Army to cross the Big Mac Line and annexe the nation of Tibia, on the Indian border. To enter Tibia from the province of Drowniang, however, Chakar troops must cross into territory claimed by India.

Bhim has a baby son, Ghatotkach, who is born in the town of Ekachakra. Sahadev challenges the champion wrestler Bakasura and is trounced. Kunti is annoyed with her other sons for allowing Sahadev to go through with it.

The Chakars annexe a piece of Indian territory and the humiliation breaks Dhritarashtra's heart and he dies.

=== The Fifteenth Book:- The Act of Free Choice ===
Counterpart to the Mahabharata's "Book of the Hermitage." Dhritarashtra leaves nothing in his will to Draupadi Mokrasi and her adoptive father worries that he will not be able to find her a suitable husband.

The Kaurava Party's Working Committee appoints the "honest but limited" Shishu Pal to replace Dhritarashtra as prime minister.

Ved Vyas convenes a training camp where the Pandavas are captivated by Draupadi. Priya Duryodhani is annoyed that Draupadi is drawing the attention away from her lectures and orders Ved Vyas to get Draupadi married. In Ved Vyas's mind, only Arjun is good enough for Draupadi, but he realises that Arjun will not be faithful to her. Priya Duryodhani decides to match her up with Ekalavya, of whom Drona had demanded his right thumb, and, apparently with whom Priya Duryodhani had had a youthful fling. Draupadi chooses Arjun, but through a misunderstanding, Kunti instructs the Pandavas to share equally the "surprise" they have brought home. All five Pandavas marry Draupadi, Ved Vyas using his father's magic to ensure that she is a virgin for each of the five successive wedding nights. Bhim's wife leaves him.

Perceiving India as weak following its defeat at the hands of the Chakars, Karnistan invades Manimir again. Shishu Pal directs a successful counterattack. Shishu Pal dies of a heart attack after signing a cease fire.

Unable to find a successor that is universally unobjectionable, the Working Committee is persuaded by Ved Vyas to appoint Priya Duryodhani.

The Pandavas work out a strict schedule to share Draupadi's bed. Arjun violates the rule when he goes to retrieve the manuscript of a speech while Yudhishtir and Draupadi are together. Under the rules, Arjun is banned from his conjugal rights for a year. Arjun decides to spend the year as a "roving correspondent" for a newspaper and, in addition to witnesses the condition of the people, he finds a new sexual companion in every locale he visits.

Arjun ends up in Gokarnam where he meets Dwarakaveetile Krishnankutty Parthasarathi Menon (known as "Krishna"), the local Kaurava Party secretary who has recently unseated the local political machine boss, Kamsa. When Arjun first sees Krishna, he is using a traditional dance form, Ottamthullal, as a medium for social satire. Arjun and Krishna become close friends and Arjun falls for Krishna's sister, Subhadra. Krishna advises Arjun to woo her through abduction. In the dark, a confused Arjun mistakenly abducts Kameswari. A second attempt is more successful and the two are married.

Arjun cables Draupadi, telling her that he is bringing home a new maid, making their eventual meeting rather uncomfortable. However, by the time Draupadi and Subhadra give birth to their sons, Prativindhya and Abhimanyu, they are as close as sisters.

=== The Sixteenth Book:- The Bungle Book – Or, the Reign of Error ===
Counterpart to the Mahabharata's "Book of the Maces." The title of this section alludes to Rudyard Kipling's The Jungle Book.

The Kaurava Party is dealt a blow in state and local elections, although still holding a majority in the national Parliament. Yudhishtir suggests that new leadership is needed. Priya Duryodhani agrees to a national election. Yudhishtir is named deputy prime minister, but is shut out of the Cabinet by Priya Duryodhani and Yudhishtir resigns.

Ashwathaman, Drona' son and the leader of a socialist splinter party, is invited by Priya Duryodhani to join the Kaurava Party Working Committee. Priya Duryodhani takes Ashwathaman's side in advocating the elimination of the privy purses of India's former princes. Yudhishtir resigns from the Working Committee. Priya Duroydhani and Ashwathaman then champion a bill to nationalise the banks.

Dr. Mehrban Imandar, the president of India, dies. The Kaurava Old Guard thwarts Priya Duryodhani by nominating Ved Vyas as the Kaurava Party's candidate for president. Priya Duryodhani backs Ekalavya as an independent candidate. The Working Committee expels Ekalavya from the Kaurava Party for opposing the party's official candidate. Before the Working Committee can act to expel Priya Duryodhani, Ekalavya narrowly wins the election.

Priya Duryodhani splits the Kaurava Party, forming the Kaurava Party (R) ("R" for "real") to oppose the Kaurava Party (O) ("O" for "official" or "old guard"). Priya Duryodhani wins with the support of the Left.

Jarasandha Khan, the military dictator ruling Karnistan, decides to call elections. The Gelabin People's Party, representing the Gelabi people of East Karnistan, wins a majority in the Karnistani Parliament. Zaleel Shah Jhoota persuades Jarashanda Khan to declare the election results null and void and declare martial law in East Karnistan. Priya Duryodhani enters the conflict on the side of the Gelabins and the Gelabi Desh War results in the creation of a new nation-state. The success against Karnistan boosts Priya Duryodhani's popularity, but her rule grows increasingly oppressive.

=== The Seventeenth Book:- The Drop of Honey – A Parable ===
Counterpart to the Mahabharata's "Book of the Great Journey."

Drona leads the opposition to Mohammed ijas's rule. Priya Duryodhani is convicted of electoral misconduct. Shakuni Shankar Dey, a Bengali lawyer and president of the Kaurava (R) Party, counsels her to declare a Siege and seize dictatorial powers. President Ekalavya concedes to the seizure of emergency powers. Priya Duryodhani orders the arrest of her political opponents.

=== The Eighteenth Book:- The Path to Salvation ===
Counterpart to the Mahabharata's "Book of the Ascent to Heaven." Ved Vyas refers to the Kama Sutra as the "Great Indian Novelty."

Priya Duryodhani calls elections. Ved Vyas chooses Krishna to lead the opposition campaign. Priya Duryodhani thus gets Krishna's experienced Kaurava Party grassroots electoral machine. At a critical moment, Krishna persuades Arjun that he should criticise Priya Duryodhani's administration instead of remaining a disinterested reporter. Bhim, Nakul, and Sahadev stay out of the campaign, refraining from endorsing either party. The People's Front defeats the Kaurava (R) Party.

Drona and Ved Vyas consult with the parties of the People's Front coalition to choose the new prime minister. Their ultimately erroneous choice is Yudhishtir. Ashwathaman is appointed head of the party organisation. The People's Front leadership gathers at the Taj Mahal for a ceremonial oath.

The return of Krishna to local politics marks the beginning of the failure of the People's Front. Yudhishtir proves to be "as stiff and straight-backed and humourless as his critics had always portrayed him, and his colossal self-righteousness was not helped by his completely inability to judge the impression he made on others." Yudhishtir becomes a target of fun in the national and international press when he admits to drinking his own urine. The "strongmen" of Yudhishtir's cabinet are locked in squabbles and Yudhishtir "remained tightly self-obsessed, seemingly unaware that half of those who sat on the executive branch with him were busily engaged in sawing it off."

Priya Duryodhani, labelling the faltering government as the "Backward Front," begins to gain political strength again. As Zaleel Shah Jhoota is toppled in another Karnistani military coup, Priya Duryodhani runs rings around her prosecutors while being tried for subverting the constitution.

Yudhishtir suffers another publicity blow when he attends a speech by a holy man who uses the word "Untouchables" instead of "Harijans." Ashwathaman criticises Yudhishtir and the party organisation awaits word from an ailing Drona that it is time for Yudhishtir to go. Yudhishtir dispatches Sahadev to tell Drona that Ashwathaman's plane has crashed. When asked Yudhishtir confirms that "Ashwathaman is dead" and Drona dies without throwing support to Yudhishtir's opponents in the People's Front.

When Ved Vyas confronts Yudhishtir regarding his lie about Ashwathaman, Yudhishtir says that early that day he had caught a cockroach, named it Ashwathaman, and killed it; thus, his statement to Drona was not a lie. Ved Vyas refuses to accept Yudhishtir's explanation and abandons him. In any case, Yudhishtir's deception is ultimately pointless. The government falls and Priya Duryodhani is victorious in the next election.

Ved Vyas sees a vision in which the Pandavas, Draupadi, and Krishna hike up a mountain. One by one they are killed, except for Yudhishtir, who reaches the top. When Kalaam, the god of time, offers to bear Yudhishtir to the court of history, Yudhishtir refuses to leave his faithful dog behind. The dog reveals himself to be Dharma, Yudhishtir's father, and the three board Kalaam's chariot together. In the court of history, Yudhishtir is stunned to find a place of honor given to Priya Duryodhani.

== Characters ==
Figures from history and characters from the Mahabharata can be directly correlated to characters in the book or to more general allegorical references. In many cases, characters are related to multiple real personages and vice versa:

Character from the Novel	Mahabharata Character	Historical Figure
Ved Vyas (V.V.-ji), the narrator, 88 years old and forced into retirement from politics, dictates his memoir	Vyasa, son of the wandering sage Parashara and fisherman's daughter Satyavati; author of the Vedas and the Mahabharata; father of Dhritarashtra, Pandu, and Vidur; when Ambika and Ambalika were sent to him to be inseminated, his ugliness caused Ambika to close her eyes (resulting in Dhritarashtra's blindness) and made Ambalika turn pale (resulting in Pandu's physical infirmity)	C. Rajagopalachari ("Rajaji"), close associate of Gandhi and last governor-general of India.; Sanjeeva Reddy, ex-Chief Minister, Andhra Pradesh, ex-speaker Lok Sabha, defeated by V.V. Giri in the presidential election in 1969, though being the official Congress candidate, last elected as president in 1977.; Acharya Kriplani, who along with Jayaprakash Narayan, was instrumental in getting Morarji Desai elected unanimously as Prime Minister candidate of the Janata party in 1977.; V. V. Giri, writer, orator, politician, labour activist, freedom fighter; served in many offices, including as governor of several states, president of India and labour minister.
Ganapathi, a young South Indian scribe sent by Ved Vyas's friend Brahm to transcribe the tale; he is described as having a "big nose and shrewd, intelligent eyes," an "elephantine treat, broad forehead," a "substantial belly" and "dragging an enormous trunk behind him"	Ganesh, the elephant-headed Hindu god who wrote down Vyasa's account of the Mahabharata	
Kanika, Minister of Hastinapura and Duryodhani's advisor	Kanika, Minister of Hastinapura	Krishna Menon, the defence minister during the China war
Ganga Datta (Gangaji or the Mahaguru), a celibate spiritual leader who begins his career as the regent of Hastinapur	Bhishma (Devavrata), celibate son of Shantanu and the river Ganga; his oath of celibacy led him to reject Amba; regent who rules Hastinapur in the absence of a legitimate ruler in the line of Satyavati, his father's second wife	Mahatma Gandhi ("Gandhiji" or the Mahatma), spiritual leader of the independence movement, who advocated celibacy
Lady Georgina Drewpad, wife of the viceroy and lover of Dhritarashtra		Edwina Mountbatten, wife of the viceroy, Lord Louis Mountbatten, who, it is rumoured, was a paramour of Nehru's
Dhritarashtra the blind, the son of Ved Vyas and Ambika, the elder heir to Vichitravirya	Dhritarashtra, the blind king of Hastinapur	Jawaharlal Nehru, India's first prime minister, often termed a blind idealist
Pandu the pale, the son of Ved Vyas and Ambalika, the younger heir to Vichitravirya, who is cursed with a heart condition that prevents him from enjoying sexual intercourse; he allows his two wives sexual freedom so that they may bear him sons (the five Pandavas). He dies when he finally succumbs to the charms of his second wife on an aeroplane.	Pandu, brother of Dhritarashtra, who suffers from a curse that says he will die if he ever engages in sexual intercourse (he eventually dies when he has sex with his second wife); his two wives take advantage of a spell through which they bear the sons of the gods (the five Pandavas)	Subhas Chandra Bose, the independence leader who, in contrast with Gandhi, took up arms against the British and accepted help from the Axis powers in establishing the Indian National Army. He was last seen boarding an aeroplane that disappeared in flight.
Vidur Hastinapuri (Vidur Dharmaputra), the wise, the son of Ved Vyas and Ambika's maidservant	Vidura, son of Vyasa and a maid, who was sent by Ambika and Ambalika to avoid having to have intercourse with him again; prime minister to Dhritarashtra, Pandu, and Duryodhan; saved the Pandavas' lives on multiple occasions	Sardar Vallabhbhai Patel, who forced the accession of the princely states and established the Indian Administrative Service
Jayaprakash Drona	Drona, the instructor in the arts of warfare to the Pandavas and Kauravas	Jayaprakash Narayan, a former freedom fighter who opposed the rule of Indira Gandhi; leader of the Janata Party, which defeated Congress in the 1977 elections
Draupadi Mokrasi ("Di Mokrasi"), illegitimate daughter of Dhritarashtra and Lady Drewpad, and wife to all five Pandavas	Draupadi, wife to all five Pandavas	Democracy
Viscount Drewpad	Drupada, the Raja of Panchala, and lifelong enemy of Drona; father of Draupadi and Shikhandi	Lord Louis Mountbatten, the last viceroy of India
Ronald Heaslop, a British official who was once friends with Drona, but when Drona asks him for assistance, Heaslop insults him	Drupada, the Raja of Panchala, who was a childhood friend of Drona, but when Drona asked for his help, Drupada insulted him	A reference to a character (also a British official in the days of the Raj) from A Passage to India by E. M. Forster.
Gandhari the Grim	Gandhari, Dritarasthra's long suffering wife	Kamala Nehru, who endured the many sexual infidelities of her husband, Jawaharlal Nehru
Shakuni Shankar Dey	Shakuni, Gandhari's wily brother, who helps Duryodhan by taking advantage of Yudhishthira's gambling addiction to engineer the Pandavas' exile	Siddhartha Shankar Ray, who held emergency dictatorial powers in West Bengal during the Naxalite uprising.
Shishu Pal, Dhritarashtra's short-lived successor	Shalya, Madri's brother	Lal Bahadur Shastri, the second prime minister, who directed a military victory against Pakistan, but died while attending cease-fire talks
Gaga Shah, founder of the Muslim Group		Aga Khan III, nobleman and imam of the Ismailis and one of the founders of the All-India Muslim League
Amba/Shikhandin, one of three royal sisters seized by Ganga Datta to be wives to Vichitravirya; Amba was in love with Raja Salva of Saubal and in the end was rejected by Salva, Vichitravirya, and Ganga Datta; she swore revenge on Ganga Datta and was instrumental in his eventual death	Amba/Shikhandi (Shikhandini), who was rejected as a wife by Bhishma and was reborn as a man to get revenge; eventually instrumental the death of Bhishma at Kurukshetra	Nathuram Godse, the killer of Gandhi
Ambika and Ambalika	Ambika and Ambalika, the sisters of Amba, who were married to Vichitravirya. When Vichitravirya died without issue, they were sent to Ved Vyas to be impregnated; horrified by Ved Vyas's appearance, Ambika closed her eyes and Ambalika turned pale with fear; on a second occasion, Ambika sent her maidservant to Ved Vyas in her stead	
the Kaurava Party	the Kauravas, the villains led by Duryodhan, who usurp the Pandavas from the rulership of Hastinapur	the Congress party
Kaurava Party (Real)		the Congress (I) Party
Kaurava Party (Old Guard)		the Indian National Congress (Organisation)
Priya Duryodhani, the autocratic villain, daughter of Dhritarashtra and head of the Kaurava Party	Duryodhana, eldest of Dhritarashtra's 100 sons, leader of the Kauravas	Indira Gandhi, daughter of Nehru, and third prime minister, who, in the early 1970s, declared an "emergency" and seized dictatorial powers
Mohammad Ali Karna, son of Kunti and Hyperion Helios, the leader of the Muslim Group and father of Karnistan; known as Khalifa-e-Mashriq ("Caliph of the East")	Karna, the elder brother of the Pandavas, who becomes an associate of Duryodhan after the Pandavas reject him	Muhammad Ali Jinnah, the father of Pakistan, who began his career as a colleague of Nehru and Gandhi in the Indian National Congress; known as Quaid-e-Azam ("Great Leader")
Mr. Rafi		Maulana Azad & Rafi Ahmed Kidwai both nationalist Indian Muslim leaders
the People's Front	the Pandavas, the heroes led by Yudhisthir	the Janata Party
Yudhishtir	Yudhishthira, eldest of the five Pandava brothers, who embodies the concept of dharma, justice, honesty, virtue; the son of Kunti and the god Yama	Morarji Desai, the honest but ineffective fourth prime minister; the Indian Judiciary
Bhim	Bhima, the second Pandava, who embodies the concept of strength; son of Kunti and the god Vayu	The Indian Army, seen as the sole incorruptible institution in Indian society
Arjun	Arjuna, the third Pandava and an expert archer, who served as the most important warrior in the Pandava forces at Kurukshetra; son of Kunti and the warrior god Indra	the Indian news media
Nakul and Sahadev	The two youngest Pandavas; twin sons of Madri and the Ashvins, the Light of Sunrise and the Light of Sunset	The Civil Service and the Foreign Service
Khushkismat Singh, the Sikh defence minister who embarrasses himself by botching a joke		Sardar Baldev Singh, India's defence minister.; Khushwant Singh, journalist, essayist, satirist, and humourist
D. Krishna Menon, a local South Indian politician, Arjun's friend and advisor	Krishna, God, and Arjun's charioteer at Kurukshetra	A K Gopalan, communist leader and first opposition leader to central government
Ekalavya	Ekalavya	V. V. Giri, writer, orator, politician, labour activist, freedom fighter; served in many offices, including as governor of several states, president of India and labour minister.; Fakhruddin Ali Ahmed, the Indian president who assented to Indira Gandhi's seizure of emergency powers
Dr. Mehrban Imandar		Zakir Husain, the third president of India, whose death sparked a struggle between Indira Gandhi and her Congress Party colleagues
Jarasandha Khan, the president of Karnistan who moves to suppress the Gelabins; defeated in the Gelabi Desh War	Jarasandha, a powerful king who is defeated only when Bhima, Arjuna, and Krishna work together to tear him in two	Ayub Khan or Yahya Khan, Dictators of Pakistan
Zaleel Shah Jhoota		Zulfikar Ali Bhutto, successor to Yahya Khan
Vyabichar Singh		Hari Singh, raja of Kashmir in 1947
Ashwathama, son of Drona, who supports Duryodhani earlier but joins opposition after getting mistreated by Duryodhani and later becomes deputy PM in Yudhistir's government	Ashwathama, son of Drona	Jagjivan Ram, defence minister in Indira Gandhi government, joins the opposition during emergency, and later becomes deputy prime minister, at the behest of Jai Prakash Narayan, in Morarji Desai government

== Reception ==
In 2020, The Independent's Emma Lee-Potter listed The Great Indian Novel as one of the 12 best Indian novels.

== Allusions/references to actual history, geography and current science ==
Certain places and events in the novel can also be correlated to real places

Place in the Novel	Actual Place
Gelabin ("Gelabin" is anagram of "Bengali". Also a pun: "(a) girl I've been" as opposed to "been girl")	Bengal
Manimir ("money" as opposed to "cash"); Summer capital, Devpur (literally God's city in Hindi); Winter capital, Marmu ("marmalade" as opposed to "jam")	Kashmir; Summer capital, Srinagar (God's city in Hindi); Winter capital, Jammu ("jam-mu")
Karnistan ("The Hacked Off Land")	Pakistan
Comea ("come" as opposed to "go")	Goa ("go-a")
Great Mango March	Gandhi's Great Salt March
the Hastinapur Massacre at the Bibighar Gardens	the Amritsar Massacre at Jallianwallah Bagh
Chakra ("chakkar" as synonym for "cheeni" (China in Hindi) and its capital Snoop-ing)	China and its capital Peking ("peek-ing")
the annexation of Hastinapur	the annexation of Oudh
the Siege	the Emergency, during which Indira Gandhi seized dictatorial powers
the Northern Province	United Provinces of Agra and Oudh
Laslut ("slut" as synonym for "whore")	Lahore
Tibia	Tibet
Drowniang ("drown" as synonym for "sink")	Sinkiang

== Release details ==
- 1989, UK, Viking (ISBN t/k), Pub date 15 August 1989 (First edition)
- 1989, India, Viking Press (ISBN 0-670-82744-4), Pub date 24 August 1989, hardback (First edition)
- 1990, UK, Penguin Books (ISBN t/k), Pub date March 1990, paperback
- 1990, India, Penguin Books (ISBN 0-14-012049-1), Pub date 26 July 1990, paperback
- 1991, USA, Arcade (ISBN 1-55970-116-1), Pub date ? April 1991, hardback
- 1993, USA, Arcade (ISBN 1-55970-194-3), Pub date ? April 1993, paperback
- 1994, UK, Picador (ISBN 0-330-33490-5), Pub date 20 May 1994, paperback
- translations into French (Seuil), German (Claasen Verlag: hardback, Surkamp: paperback), Italian (Frassinelli), Malayalam (tr. K. B. Prasannakumar, pub. DC Books), Spanish (Akal)
