= Shashi Tharoor =

Indian politician and author (born 1956)

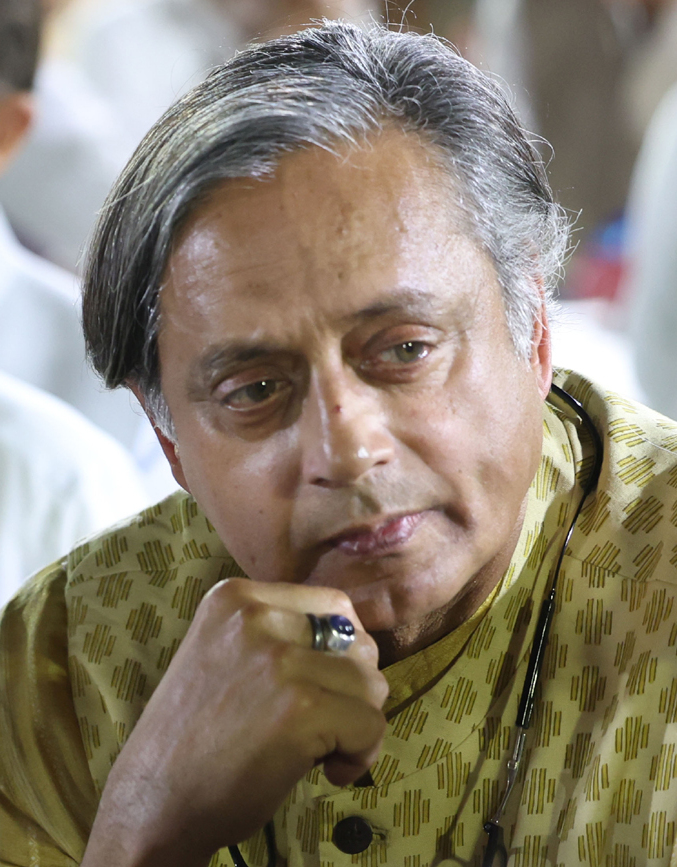
- Tharoor in 2025

Chairman of Standing Committee on External Affairs
- Incumbent
- Assumed office 26 September 2024
- Appointed by: Om Birla
- Preceded by: P. P. Chaudhary

Member of Parliament, Lok Sabha
- Incumbent
- Assumed office 31 May 2009
- Preceded by: Pannyan Raveendran
- Constituency: Thiruvananthapuram, Kerala
Prior offices
Union Minister of State for Human Resource Development
In office 28 October 2012 – 26 May 2014
| Prime Minister | Manmohan Singh |
| Minister | Kapil Sibal; M. M. Pallam Raju |
| Preceded by | Daggubati Purandeswari |
| Succeeded by | Upendra Kushwaha |
Union Minister of State for External Affairs
In office 28 May 2009 – 18 April 2010
| Prime Minister | Manmohan Singh |
| Minister | S. M. Krishna |
| Preceded by | Anand Sharma |
| Succeeded by | E. Ahamed |
United Nations Under-Secretary-General for Communications and Public Information
In office 1 June 2002 – 9 February 2007
| Secretary-General | Kofi Annan |
| Preceded by | Office established |
| Succeeded by | Kiyotaka Akasaka |
Chairman of Standing Committee on Communications and Information Technology
In office 13 September 2019 – 12 September 2022
| Appointed by | Om Birla |
| Preceded by | Anurag Thakur |
| Succeeded by | Nishikant Dubey |
Chairman of Standing Committee on Chemicals & Fertilizers
In office 13 September 2022 – 12 September 2024
| Appointed by | Om Birla |
| Preceded by | Kanimozhi Rajathi Karunanidhi |
| Succeeded by | Kirti Azad |
Chairman of the All India Professionals Congress
In office 1 August 2017 – 15 November 2023
| AICC President | Sonia Gandhi; Rahul Gandhi; Mallikarjun Kharge |
| Preceded by | Office established |
| Succeeded by | Praveen Chakravarty |

Personal details
- Born: Shashi Krishnan Chandrashekharan Tharoor; 9 March 1956 (age 70) London, England, U.K.
- Party: Indian National Congress (since 1979)
- Spouses: Tilottama Mukherji (m. 1981, divorced); Christa Giles (m. 2007; div. 2010); Sunanda Pushkar (m. 2010; died 2014)
- Relations: Lieutenant General Rajesh Pushkar (Brother-in-law)
- Children: 2, including Ishaan
- Education: Delhi University (BA); Tufts University (MA, MALD, PhD)
- Occupation: Writer; orator; public intellectual; former diplomat; bureaucrat; statesman
- Awards: Full list
- Website: shashitharoor.in
- Writing career
- Years active: 1974–present
- Period: Postmodern
- Genres: Novel; short story; non-fiction
- Subjects: Economics; history; governance; foreign policy; geopolitics
- Notable works: The Great Indian Novel; India: From Midnight to the Millennium; Why I Am a Hindu; Inglorious Empire: What the British Did to India

Shashi Tharoor (Malayalam pronunciation: [ʃɐʃi t̪ɐɾuːr]; born 9 March 1956) is an Indian politician, author, intellectual, diplomat, and bureaucrat. A member of the Indian National Congress, he has represented Thiruvananthapuram, Kerala, in the Lok Sabha since 2009. He was formerly an Under-Secretary-General of the United Nations and ran for the office of Secretary-General in 2006, coming second.

== Early life and education ==
Shashi Tharoor was born on 9 March 1956 in London, England as Shashi Krishnan Chandrashekaran Tharoor to Chandra Shekharan Nair Tharoor and Sulekha Menon, a Nair couple from Palakkad, Kerala, India. Tharoor has two younger sisters, Shobha and Smitha. His mother-tongue is Malayalam, and he is also fluent in French.

Tharoor's father worked in various positions in London, Bombay, Calcutta and Delhi, including a 25-year career (culminating as group advertising manager) for The Statesman. Tharoor's parents returned to India when he was 2-years old, where he joined the Montfort School, Yercaud, in 1962, subsequently moving to Bombay (now Mumbai) and studying at the Campion School (1963–68). He spent his high school years at St. Xavier's Collegiate School, Calcutta (1969–71).

In 1975, Tharoor graduated with a Bachelor of Arts degree in history from St. Stephen's College, Delhi, where he had been president of the student union and also founded the St. Stephen's Quiz Club. Within the same year, Tharoor went to the United States to obtain an M.A. in international relations from The Fletcher School of Law and Diplomacy at Tufts University in Medford. After obtaining his M.A. in 1976, Tharoor further obtained his Master of Arts in Law and Diplomacy in 1977 and his Ph.D. in International Relations and Affairs in 1978. While he was pursuing his doctorate, Tharoor was awarded the Robert B. Stewart Prize for best student and was also the first editor-in-chief of the Fletcher Forum of International Affairs. At the age of 22, he was the youngest person to receive a doctorate in the history of the Fletcher School.

== Diplomatic career (1978–2007) ==
Tharoor's career in the United Nations began in 1978 as a staff member of the UN High Commissioner for Refugees (UNHCR) in Geneva. From 1981 until 1984 he was head of the UNHCR office in Singapore, during the boat people crisis, leading the organisation's rescue efforts at sea and succeeding in resettling a backlog of Vietnamese refugees. He also processed Polish and Acehnese refugee cases. After a further stint at the UNHCR headquarters in Geneva, during which he became the first chairman of the staff elected by UNHCR personnel worldwide, Tharoor left UNHCR. In 1989 he was appointed special assistant to the Under-secretary-general for special political affairs, the unit that later became the Peacekeeping Operations Department in New York. Until 1996, he led the team responsible for peacekeeping operations in the former Yugoslavia, spending considerable time on the ground during the civil war there.

=== UN Assistant Secretary and Under-Secretary-General ===
In 1996, Tharoor was appointed director of communications and special projects and executive assistant to Secretary-general Kofi Annan. In January 2001, Tharoor was appointed as Interim Head of the Department of Public Information (DPI) at the assistant-secretary-general level. He was subsequently confirmed as the under-secretary-general for communications and public information (UNDPI) with effect from 1 June 2002. In this capacity, he was responsible for the United Nations' communications strategy, enhancing the image and effectiveness of the organisation. In 2003 the secretary-general gave him the additional responsibility of United Nations coordinator for multilingualism. During his tenure at the UNDPI, Tharoor reformed the department and undertook a number of initiatives, ranging from organizing and conducting the first-ever UN seminar on Anti Semitism, the first-ever UN seminar on Islamophobia after the 11 September attacks, and launching an annual list of "Ten Under-Reported Stories the World Ought to Know about", which was last produced in 2008 by his successor.

On 9 February 2007, Tharoor resigned from the post of under-secretary-general and left the UN on 1 April 2007.

=== 2006 campaign for Secretary-General ===
In 2006, the government of India nominated Tharoor for the post of UN Secretary General. Had he won, the 50-year-old Shashi Tharoor would have become the second-youngest secretary-general, after the 46-year-old Dag Hammarskjöld. Although all previous Secretaries-General had come from small countries, Prime Minister Manmohan Singh and National Security Advisor M. K. Narayanan felt that Tharoor's candidacy would demonstrate India's willingness to play a larger role at the United Nations.

Tharoor finished second, behind Ban Ki-moon of South Korea, in each of the four straw polls conducted by the UN Security Council. In the final round, Ban emerged as the only candidate not to be vetoed by one of the permanent members, while Tharoor received one veto from the United States. U.S. ambassador John Bolton later revealed his instructions from Condoleezza Rice: "We don't want a strong Secretary-General." Tharoor was a protégé of the independently minded Kofi Annan, and a senior American official told Tharoor that the US was determined to have "No more Kofis." After the vote, Tharoor withdrew his candidacy and declined Ban Ki-moon's invitation to remain in service beyond the expiry of his term as under-secretary-general.

== Post-diplomatic career (2007–2009) ==
External videos
- "Why nations should pursue soft power", TED talk, November 2009

In February 2007, amidst speculation about his post-UN future, the Indian press reported that Tharoor might be inducted into the Council of Ministers of Prime Minister Manmohan Singh as Minister of State for External Affairs. In the same month, an American gossip blog reported that Tharoor was a finalist for the position of dean of the USC Annenberg School for Communication in Los Angeles, but he withdrew his name from consideration at the final stage. Instead, Tharoor became chairman of Dubai-based Afras Ventures, which established the Afras Academy for Business Communication (AABC) in Thiruvananthapuram, Kerala, the city in which he would go on to win a record four parliamentary elections. He also spoke around the world about India and Kerala, where he spent increasing amounts of time before moving to India in October 2008.

Prior to embarking on his political career, Tharoor also served on the board of overseers of the Fletcher School of Law and Diplomacy, the board of trustees of the Aspen Institute, and the advisory boards of the Indo-American Arts Council, the American India Foundation, the World Policy Journal, the Virtue Foundation, and the human rights organisation Breakthrough. At the Fletcher School of Law and Diplomacy in 1976, he founded and was the first chair of the editorial board of The Fletcher Forum of World Affairs, a journal examining issues in international relations. Tharoor was an international adviser to the International Committee of the Red Cross in Geneva from 2008 to 2011. He served on the advisory council of the Hague Institute for International Justice and was elected Fellow of the New York Institute for the Humanities during 1995–96. He also supported various educational causes, including as Patron of GEMS Modern Academy in Dubai.

== Political career (2009–present) ==
=== In government (2009–2014) ===
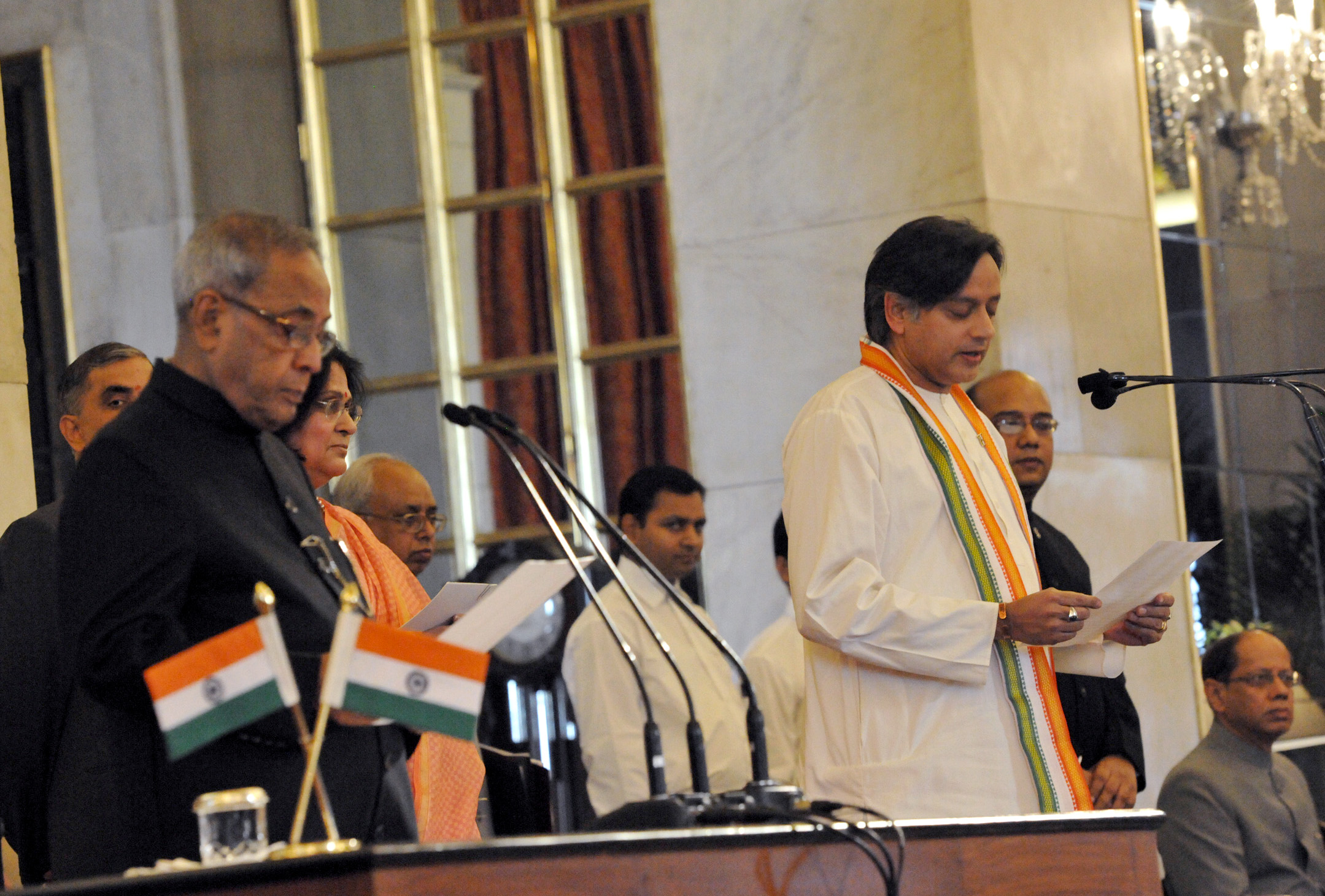
13th President of India Pranab Mukherjee administering the oath as Minister of State to Shashi Tharoor at a Swearing-in Ceremony, at Rashtrapati Bhavan, in New Delhi in 2012.

When Tharoor began his political career, he was approached by the Congress, the Communists, and the BJP. He chose the INC because he felt ideologically aligned with the party. In March 2009, Tharoor contested the Indian General elections as a candidate for the Congress Party in Thiruvananthapuram, Kerala. His opponents included P. Ramachandran Nair of the Communist Party of India (CPI), Neelalohitadasan Nadar of the Bahujan Samaj Party (BSP), MP Gangadharan of the Nationalist Congress Party (NCP), and PK Krishna Das of the Bharatiya Janata Party (BJP). Despite criticism that he was an "elite outsider", Tharoor won the elections by a margin of 99,989. He was then selected as a minister of state in the Council of Ministers of Prime Minister Manmohan Singh. On 28 May 2009, he was sworn in as minister of state for external affairs, in charge of Africa, Latin America, and the Gulf, including the Hajj pilgrimage, and the consular, passports, and visas services of the ministry. As minister of state for external affairs, he re-established long-dormant diplomatic relationships with African nations, where his fluency in French made him popular with Francophone countries and their heads of state.

Tharoor was a pioneer in using social media as an instrument of political interaction. He was India's most-followed politician on Twitter until 2013, when he was overtaken by future prime minister Narendra Modi. Some of his Twitter posts have proved controversial in the past and were highlighted negatively by the opposition and press.

Tharoor was also the first Indian minister to visit Haiti after the devastating 2010 earthquake. He reformed the arrangements relating to the conduct of the Hajj pilgrimage. He initiated new policy-planning activities on the Indian Ocean and represented India at various global events during his 11-month tenure as minister. In April 2010, Tharoor resigned from the position as Minister of State for External Affairs following allegations that he had misused his office to get shares in an Indian Premier League (IPL) cricket franchise. He denied the charges and, during his resignation speech in Parliament, called for a full inquiry. In a 2014 rejoinder he defended his position: "I was never involved in a scam of any sort in the IPL- I was brought down because...[I had] antagonised some powerful political cricketing interests" and added that he had "cooperated extensively with the detailed investigation conducted by the Enforcement Directorate into the entire issue", and no wrongdoing had been found.

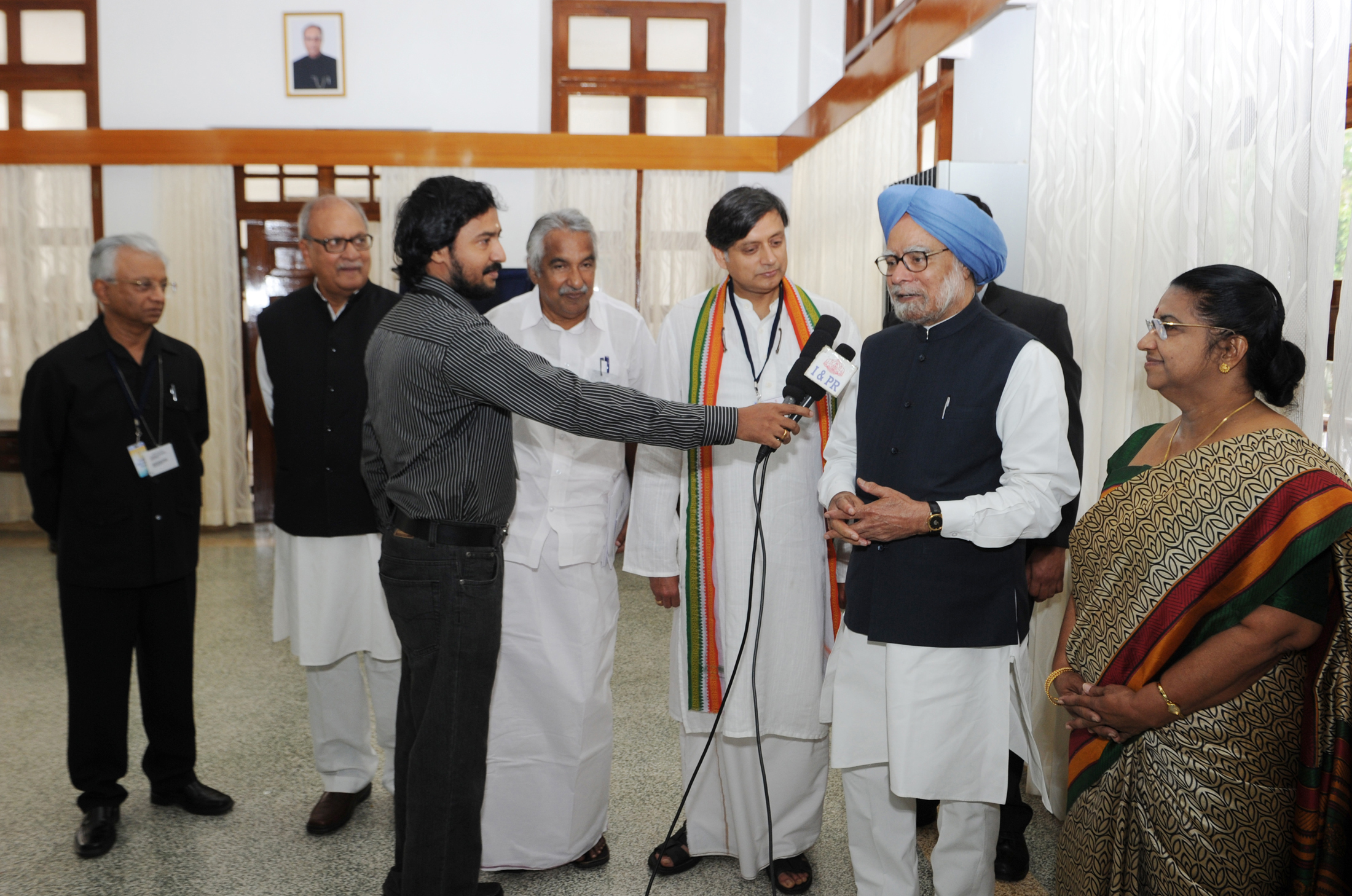
13th prime minister of India Manmohan Singh with Shashi Tharoor and Chief Minister Oommen Chandy unveiling the commemoration plaque of the offsite Campus of Central University of Kerala at Thiruvananthapuram, in Kerala.

Between 2010 and 2012, Tharoor remained active in Parliament and was member-convenor of the Parliamentary Forum on Disaster Management, a member of the Standing Committee on External Affairs, of the Consultative Committee of Defence, the Public Accounts Committee, and the Joint Parliamentary Committee on Telecoms. He participated in several important debates of the 15th Lok Sabha, including on the Lokpal Bill, the demand for grants of the Ministry of External Affairs and of the Ministry of Commerce and Industry, the black money debate, and so on. In the special debate on the 60th anniversary of the Indian Parliament, Tharoor was one of four members of the Congress Party, including party President Sonia Gandhi, Prime Minister Manmohan Singh, and Leader of the House Pranab Mukherjee, to be invited to address the Lok Sabha.

In 2012, Tharoor was re-inducted into the Union Council of Ministers by Prime Minister Manmohan Singh with the portfolio of minister of state for Human Resource Development. In this role, he took special interest in the problems and challenges of adult education, distance education and enhancing high-quality research by academic institutions. He was responsible for the ministry's written answers to Parliament's questions and responded to oral questions on education during the Lok Sabha's Question Hour. He addressed forums and conferences on education, explained a vision of India's educational challenges in the context of the country's demographic opportunities, and stressed that education was not only a socioeconomic issue, but also a national security issue.

As Member of Parliament for Thiruvananthapuram, Tharoor became the first elected representative in India to issue annual reports on his work as MP, including furnishing accounts of his MPLADS expenditure. In 2012, he published a half-term report followed in 2014 by a full-term report.

=== In opposition (2014–present) ===
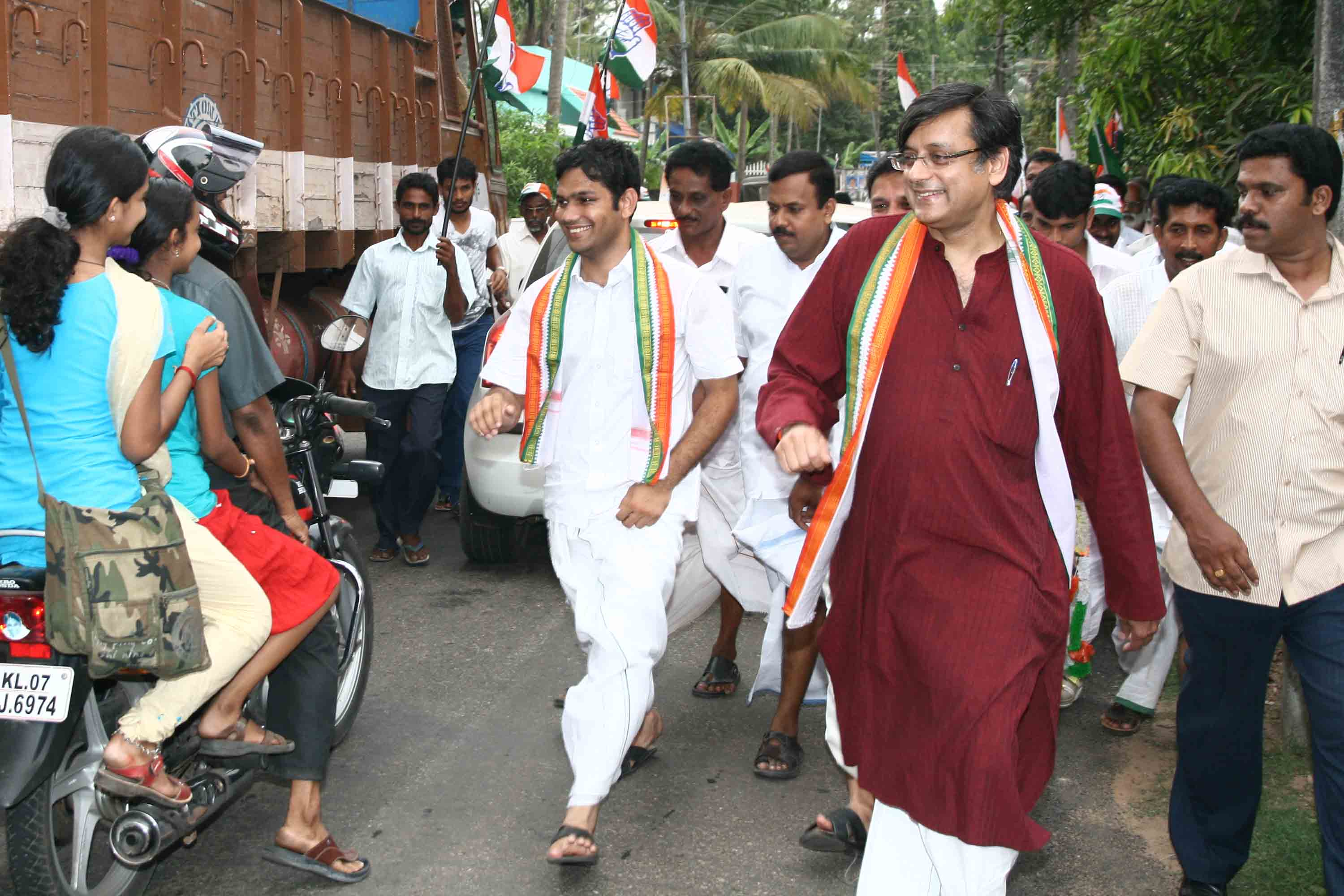
Shashi Tharoor at a march parade with NSUI President Hibi Eden and other Congress workers in Ernakulam, Kerala.

In May 2014, Tharoor won his re-election from Thiruvananthapuram, defeating O. Rajagopal of the Bharatiya Janata Party by a margin of around 15,700 votes, and became a member of the 16th Lok Sabha, sitting in Opposition. Following a rout of the INC, he was named chairman of the Parliamentary Standing Committee on External Affairs.

In regards to Tharoor's removal from the post of INC spokesperson after he made positive remarks regarding Narendra Modi, Kolkata's The Telegraph opined, "For an Opposition MP to have and to exercise the freedom to appreciate a good thing done by the government and for a ruling party MP to speak and vote against the party line is not just legitimate parliamentary practice, it is the very essence of parliamentary democracy. Shashi Tharoor, from the ranks of Congress, has tried to do that; there is not one BJP MP who has matched him. Blind conformism is not loyalty, nor independent thinking, dissent."

In 2014, Tharoor was asked to help the treasury benches draft a statement condemning Pakistan for freeing Zaki-ur-Rehman Lakhvi, the Lashkar-e-Toiba commander, who masterminded the 2008 Mumbai attacks that killed 166 people. In January 2015, Tharoor asked not to debunk genuine accomplishments of Ancient Indian Science due to exaggerations of the Hindutva brigade, amid 2015 Indian Science Congress ancient aircraft controversy.

In March 2017, Tharoor called for the Victoria Memorial in Kolkata to be converted into a museum on the effects of British colonial rule in India. Tharoor wrote in an Al Jazeera article that the British "conquered one of the richest countries in the world (27 per cent of global gross domestic product in 1700) and reduced it to, after over two centuries of looting and exploitation, one of the poorest, most diseased and most illiterate countries on Earth by the time they left in 1947. ...Nor is there any memorial to the massacres of the Raj, from Delhi in 1857 to Amritsar in 1919, the deaths of 35 million Indians in unnecessary famines caused by British [policies]".

He declined and dismissed any suggestions regarding the potential of him being named as the UPA's prime ministerial candidate in 2019.

Tharoor has also attempted to introduce several Private Members' Bills in the Parliament, rare for an Indian parliamentarian. Notably, his efforts to amend Section 377 of the Indian Penal Code were voted out by the majority of parliamentarians on two occasions. The Apex court of India later ruled in favor of amending the controversial article in 2018, thereby vindicating the position advocated by Tharoor. Tharoor got elected to the AICC Working committee on 20 August 2023. In the 2024 election, he was re-elected, defeating BJP cabinet minister Rajeev Chandrashekar.

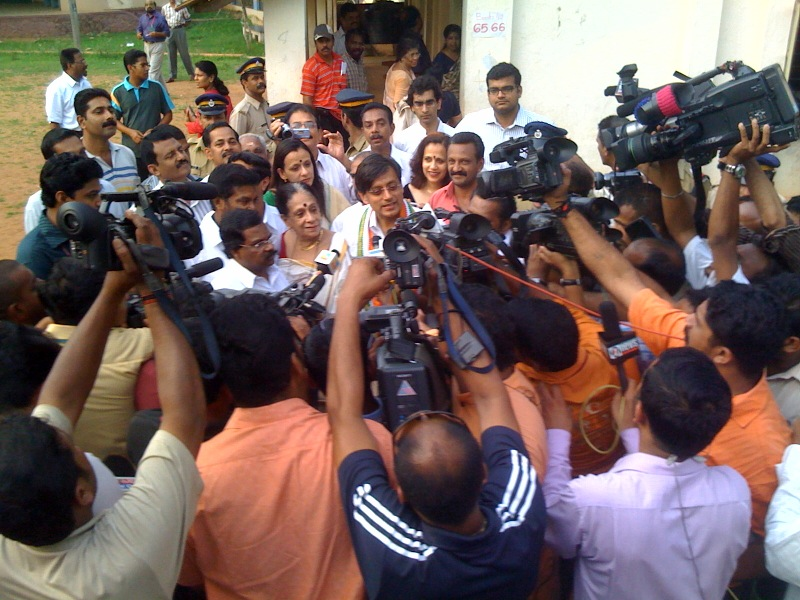
Tharoor is swarmed by media after voting in the 2009 general election.

While in opposition, he was appointed to multiple positions by the Modi-led government. In 2019, he was appointed as the chairman of Standing Committee on Communications and Information Technology. On 26 September 2024, he was appointed as the chairman of Committee on External Affairs.

Tharoor, then chairman of Committee on External Affairs in 16th Lok Sabha, presented the 12th report for expanding and building the numbers, quality and capacity of India's diplomats. In March 2023, Parliamentary Committee on External Affairs criticized the service for being severely short-staffed and under-budgeted.

In May 2025, he led the Indian government's US and Panama delegation for a diplomatic outreach program to key partner countries over the April 22 Pahalgam terror attack and India's subsequent retaliation against terror camps located in Pakistan, named Operation Sindoor. He termed the opportunity as a "great honour" and a "matter of duty" as a citizen of India and said he looks forward to playing his part in leading the delegation even as his party, Congress, has frowned upon his inclusion. He asserted that only national interest is above everything else. Tharoor explicitly identified Pakistan as the principal perpetrator. He emphasized in diplomatic briefings and public statements that the attack was carried out by militants linked to Lashkar-e-Taiba, operating with Pakistan's support, and stressed that India's response targeted only terrorist infrastructure. During the delegation's visit to the 9/11 Memorial in New York, Tharoor highlighted the shared experience of India and the US as victims of terrorism and called for global solidarity in holding state sponsors of terror accountable.

== Electoral performances ==
| Year | Constituency | Party | Votes | % | Opponent | Opponent Party | Opponent Votes | % | Result | Margin | % |
|---|---|---|---|---|---|---|---|---|---|---|---|
| 2024 | Thiruvananthapuram | INC | 358,155 | 37.19 | Rajeev Chandrasekhar | BJP | 342,078 | 35.52 | Won | 16,077 | 1.66 |
| 2019 | Thiruvananthapuram | INC | 416,131 | 41.19 | Kummanam Rajasekharan | BJP | 316,142 | 31.30 | Won | 99,989 | 9.89 |
| 2014 | Thiruvananthapuram | INC | 297,806 | 34.09 | O. Rajagopal | BJP | 282,336 | 32.32 | Won | 15,470 | 1.77 |
| 2009 | Thiruvananthapuram | INC | 326,725 | 44.29 | P. Ramachandran Nair | CPI | 226,727 | 30.74 | Won | 99,998 | 13.55 |

== Publications ==
Tharoor has been a columnist in each of India's three best-known English-language newspapers, most recently for The Hindu (2001–2008) and in a weekly column, "Shashi on Sunday," in the Times of India (January 2007 – December 2008). Following his resignation as Minister of State for External Affairs, he began a fortnightly column on foreign policy issues in the Deccan Chronicle. Previously he was a columnist for the Gentleman magazine and the Indian Express newspaper, as well as a frequent contributor to Newsweek International and the International Herald Tribune. His op-eds and book reviews have appeared in The Washington Post, The New York Times and the Los Angeles Times, amongst other papers. His monthly column, "India Reawakening", distributed by Project Syndicate, appears in 80 newspapers around the world. As of 2021, Tharoor has written twenty-three books in English.

Tharoor began writing at the age of 6, and his first published story appeared in the Sunday edition of The Free Press Journal, in Mumbai at age 10. His World War II adventure novel Operation Bellows about an RAF pilot Reginald Bellows, inspired by the Biggles books, was serialised in the Junior Statesman starting a week before his 11th birthday. The Great Indian Novel had had 43 reprints as of October 2014, and a Silver Jubilee special edition was issued on the book's 25th anniversary in October 2014, by Viking Penguin India. The Elephant, the Tiger and the Cellphone has also undergone several hardback re-prints. President Bill Clinton cited Shashi Tharoor's book India From Midnight to the Millennium in his speech to the Indian parliament in 2000.

Tharoor has lectured widely on India, and is often quoted for his observations, including, "India is not, as people keep calling it, an underdeveloped country, but rather, in the context of its history and cultural heritage, a highly developed one in an advanced state of decay." He also coined a comparison of India's "thali" to the American "melting pot": "If America is a melting pot, then to me India is a thali – a selection of sumptuous dishes in different bowls. Each tastes different, and does not necessarily mix with the next, but they belong together on the same plate, and they complement each other in making the meal a satisfying repast".

Shashi Tharoor's non-fiction work An Era of Darkness, published later in the United Kingdom as Inglorious Empire: What the British Did to India, arose out of a speech he made at the Oxford Union, was published in 2016. It has sold over 100,000 copies in hardback reprints and continues to be a bestseller in the country. The British edition rose to Number 1 in the London Evening Standard bestseller lists. Since then, he has published two other non-fiction books: Why I Am A Hindu (2018) and The Paradoxical Prime Minister (2018), both of which have been published in the Indian subcontinent by the Aleph Book Company. The two books, both mega-bestsellers in India. Why I Am a Hindu makes the point that it is precisely because Hindus form the majority that India has survived as a plural, secular democracy, a status that come under threat in the present world. The Paradoxical Prime Minister was a critical study of the present Prime Minister Narendra Modi and the effect he has had on India, along with other questions about a leader who is reviled and worshipped in equal measure.

Victor Mallet in the Financial Times said Tharoor "wants us to understand the origins of the difficulties that confronted India" after Indian independence. An article by the New Statesman said it was especially important for readers in Britain in the light of post-Brexit discussions. Tharoor has called for the British government to pay "colonial reparations" to India.

In September 2019, he published a new book, The Hindu Way: An Introduction, in line with his research into Hindu culture and ways of life of late. In 2020 he published The New World Disorder And the Indian Imperative, co-authored with Samir Saran, President of the Observer Research Foundation (ORF). The book is a crucial study on the current state of chaos in international politics and identifies India's imminent role, as a non-hegemonic global power, in scripting an equitable ethic for a new international order.

== Personal life ==
Tharoor's first wife was Tilottama Mukherji, a half-Bengali and half-Kashmiri academic, and the granddaughter of politician Kailash Nath Katju. Tharoor and Mukherji had been college sweethearts and were married in 1981. After their marriage, Tilottama took her husband's last name and began teaching English at Ngee Ann Polytechnic and also worked as a freelance writer. Their twin sons, Kanishk and Ishaan, were born prematurely in 1984 at the KK Hospital in Singapore. Ishaan Tharoor grew up in Geneva, Switzerland, and was a foreign affairs journalist at The Washington Post. Kanishk is a former editor at Open Democracy and is the author of the highly praised short story collection Swimmer Among The Stars. Tilottama is currently a professor of humanities at New York University.

Tharoor and Tilottama were divorced at some point. In 2007, Tharoor married Christa Giles, a Canadian diplomat working at the United Nations. This marriage was short-lived. Tharoor next married Dubai-based businesswoman a Kashmiri Pandit Sunanda Pushkar at his ancestral home in Elavanchery village in Kerala's Palakkad district on 22 August 2010. He became her third husband, and step-father to her son Shiv Menon, born of a previous marriage. On 17 January 2014, Pushkar (aged 51) died at The Leela Hotel in Chanakyapuri, New Delhi, under mysterious circumstances. In May 2018, Tharoor was charged with encouraging the suicide of his wife and marital cruelty under sections 306 and 498A of the Indian Penal Code. On 18 August 2021, a court in Delhi discharged Tharoor from all the charges.

Tharoor is a vegetarian and he "abhors the idea of consuming the corpses of animals," although he claimed that he does not have a problem with those who do. He has stated that he is "very proud of being a Hindu" and that he's a "worshipping" and "believing Hindu". Tharoor also claims to have read a "fair amount" of the Upanishads.

In April 2019, Tharoor had an accident when praying during a Tulabharam ritual at a temple in Thiruvananthapuram. After being discharged, he sought a probe by the government into the incident.

=== Outside politics ===
Shashi Tharoor was one of the first nine celebrities nominated in 2014 by the prime minister Narendra Modi to spread awareness regarding cleanliness, hygiene and good sanitation and make Swachh Bharat Mission a people's movement. He responded by cleaning the Vizhinjam port on the outskirts of Thiruvananthapuram.

Currently, he is on the board of advisors of India's International Movement to Unite Nations (I.I.M.U.N.).

== IPL Controversy ==
The IPL controversy related with Kochi Tuskers Kerala in 2010 involved an Indian businessman Lalit Modi, Tharoor, then a Union Minister and his then friend and later wife Sunanda Pushkar. Modi, who was the founder and first chairman of the Indian Premier League (IPL) was banned by the Board of Control for Cricket in India (BCCI) for life on September 25, 2013 involving many disputes arising after the Kochi Tuskers matter. The core allegations related to improper use of political coercion and that of "sweat equity". The controversy erupted when Modi publicly revealed the details as regards the ownership of the then newly awarded Kochi Tuskers franchise. He said that a 25% "free equity" of Kochi Tuskars had been allocated to Sunanda Pushkar. Modi said he would not sign this franchise agreement until the financial origins of this stake were brought on record in a clear and distinct manner. This had resulted in massive political and sports controversy, leading to Tharoor's resignation from Union Cabinet and life time ban to Modi. Modi made a spate of podcast and media interviews in June 2026. In these interviews, including a detailed interview with ANI Editor-in-Chief Smita Prakash, Modi made several sensational claims against many Congress leaders, including Tharoor and ex Congress President Sonia Gandhi. Modi claimed that his strict crackdown on illegal betting and match-fixing had angered the mafia and the underworld. He claimed that Gandhi had backed Tharoor. Modi claimed Tharoor initially "sucked up" to him, visiting his house and making sweet talks to accommodate the franchise arrangements to Sunanda Pushkar in Kochi Tuskers. When Modi allegedly declined to do so, Tharoor allegedly directly threatened Modi with government raids if he questioned the equity structure of the Kochi Tuskers. He even named Sonia Gandhi, claiming that "all guns were trained on me", naming Ahmed Patel, Pranab Mukherjee, and Rajiv Shukla, as pressurizing him to clear the Kochi franchise deal on behalf of Gandhi. He alleged that the then BCCI President Shashank Manohar had also asked him to do so, specifically mentioned 10-Janpath pressure. Modi claimed the Congress party is running a long-term vendetta against him, where Rahul Gandhi continues to target him during elections even today. He said he possesses huge amount of evidences of this targeted witch-hunt against him. So far there has been no response from Tharoor or the Congress Party.

== Honours and awards ==
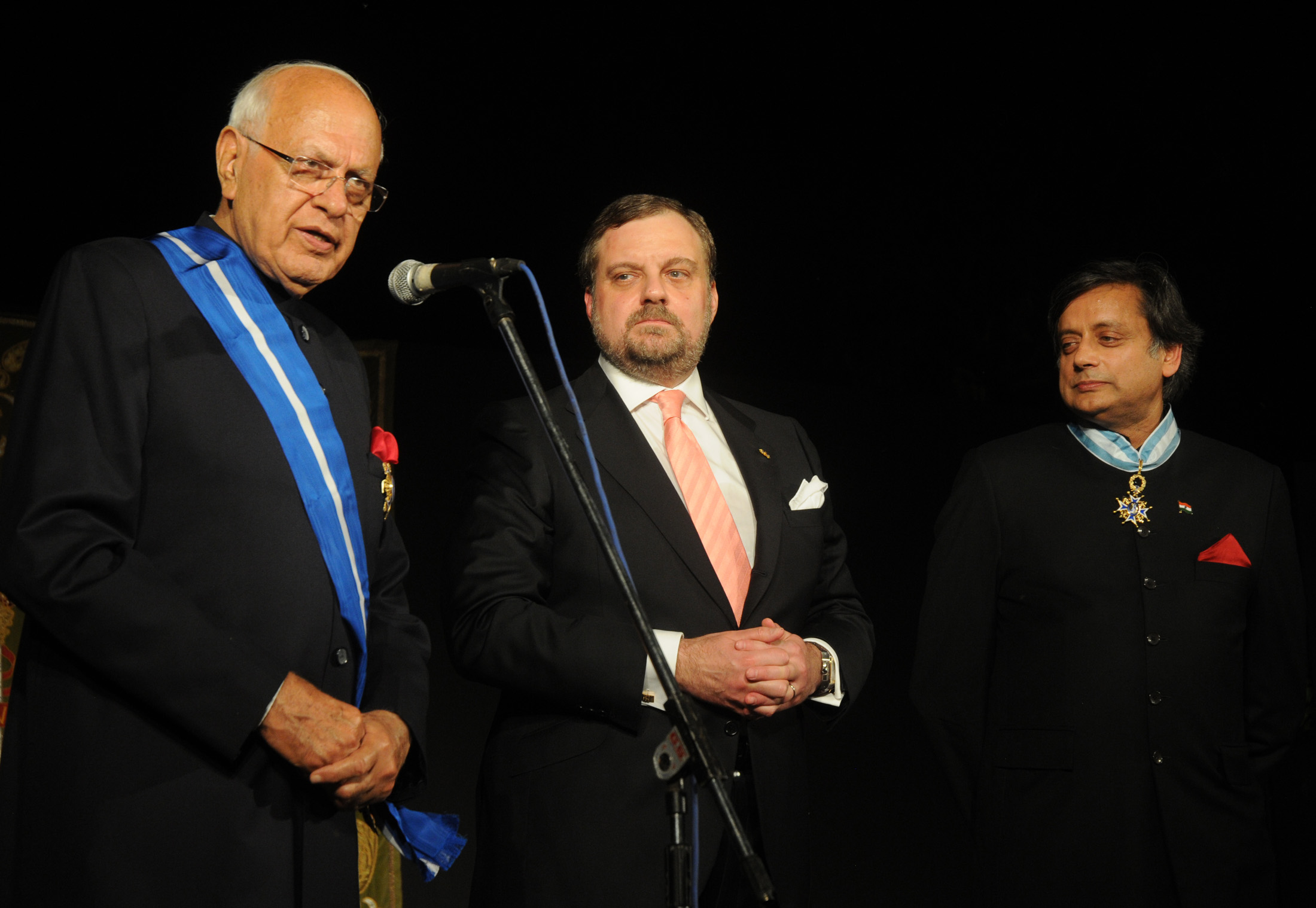
Ambassador of Spain to India Gustavo de Aristégui conferring Civilian Honour by the Government of Spain on the occasion of the National Day of Spain to Tharoor and Farooq Abdullah.

- 1976 – Rajika Kripalani Young Journalist Award for the Best Indian Journalist under 30.
- 1990 – Federation of Indian Publishers' Hindustan Times Literary Award for the Best Book of the Year for The Great Indian Novel.
- 1991 – Commonwealth Writers' Prize for the Best Book of the Year in the Eurasian Region, for The Great Indian Novel
- 1998 – Excelsior Award for excellence in literature, Association of Indians in America (AIA) and the Network of Indian Professionals (NetIP).
- 1998 – Global Leader of Tomorrow, World Economic Forum in Davos, Switzerland
- 2009 – Zakir Hussain Memorial "Pride of India" Award.
- 2009 – Inspiration of the Year Award at GQ's Man of the Year Awards.
- 2009 – Hakim Khan Sur Award for National Integration, Maharana of Udaipur.
- 2010 – Sarva Deshiya Prathibha Award, Pazhassiraja Charitable Trust, Kozhikode.
- 2010 – "New Age Politician of the Year" Award, at NDTV's Indian of the Year awards.
- 2010 – Fifth IILM Distinguished Global Thinker Award, New Delhi.
- 2010 – Digital person of the year, Indian Digital Media Awards (IDMA), for popularising the digital medium in India.
- 2013 – First Sree Narayan Guru Global Secular and Peace Award at Thiruvananthapuram.
- 2013 – PETA's "Person of the Year".
- 2019 – Sahitya Akademi Award for his book, An Era of Darkness: The British Empire in India.

=== State honors ===
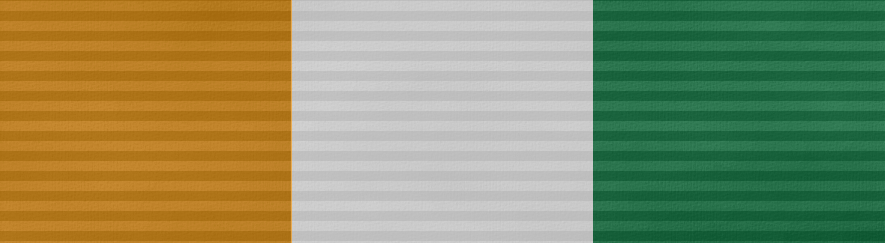
- 2004 – India : Pravasi Bharatiya Samman, India's highest honour for non-resident Indians (accepted 2007)
- 2012 – Spain : Commander of the Order of Charles III by King of Spain
- 2022 – France : Chevalier de la Légion d'honneur, for his writings and speeches

=== Honorary degrees ===
- 2026 - Honorary Doctor of Letters from St. Xavier's University, Kolkata
- 2023 - Honorary Doctor of International Relations Geneva School of Diplomacy and International Relations
- Honorary Doctor of Letters in International Affairs from University of Puget Sound
- Doctor Honoris Causa in history from University of Bucharest.

== Bibliography ==
=== Fiction ===
- The Great Indian Novel (1989)
- The Five Dollar Smile and Other Stories (1990)
- Show Business (1992)
- Riot (2001)

=== Non-fiction ===
- Reasons of State (1985)
- India: From Midnight to the Millennium (1997)
- Nehru: The Invention of India. Arcade Publishing (2003). New York. First edition. ISBN 9781559706971
- Bookless in Baghdad (2005)
- The Elephant, the Tiger, and the Cell Phone: Reflections on India – The Emerging 21st-Century Power (2007)
- Shadows Across the Playing Field: Sixty Years of India-Pakistan Cricket (2009) (with Shaharyar Khan)
- Upworldly Mobile: Behaviour and Business Skills for the New Indian manager (2011) (foreword, with Ranjini Manian)
- Pax Indica: India and the World of the 21st Century (2012)
- India: the Future is Now (Editor) (2013)
- India Shastra: Reflections on the Nation in our Time (2015)
- Inglorious Empire: What the British Did to India (2017), first published in India as An Era of Darkness: The British Empire in India (2016).
- Why I Am A Hindu (2018)
- The Paradoxical Prime Minister (2018)
- The Hindu Way (2019)
- The New World Disorder and the Indian Imperative (2020), co-authored with Samir Saran.
- The Battle of Belonging (2020)
- Tharoorosaurus (2020)
- Pride, Prejudice and Punditry: The Essential Shashi Tharoor (2021)
- The Struggle for India's Soul: Nationalism and the Fate of Democracy (2021)
- Ambedkar: A Life (2022)
- A Wonderland of Words: Around The World In 101 Essays (2024)
- Our Living Constitution: A Concise Introduction and Commentary Shashi Tharoor (2025)
- The Sage Who Reimagined Hinduism: The Life, Lessons, & Legacy of Sree Narayana Guru (2025)

=== Illustrated books ===
- Kerala: God's Own Country (2002) (along with artist M. F. Husain).
- Inde (in French) or India (in English) (2008) along with photographer Ferrante Ferranti.

== See also ==
- Shashi Tharoor's Oxford Union speech
- List of Indian writers
- 2022 Indian National Congress leadership election

Lok Sabha
| Preceded by Pannyan Raveendran | Member of Parliament for Thiruvananthapuram; 2009 | Incumbent |
Diplomatic posts
| Preceded by Not sure | Under Secretary General; UN Communications and Public Information; 2001–2007 | Succeeded by Kiyotaka Akasaka |
