= Aleph Book Company =

Publishing company

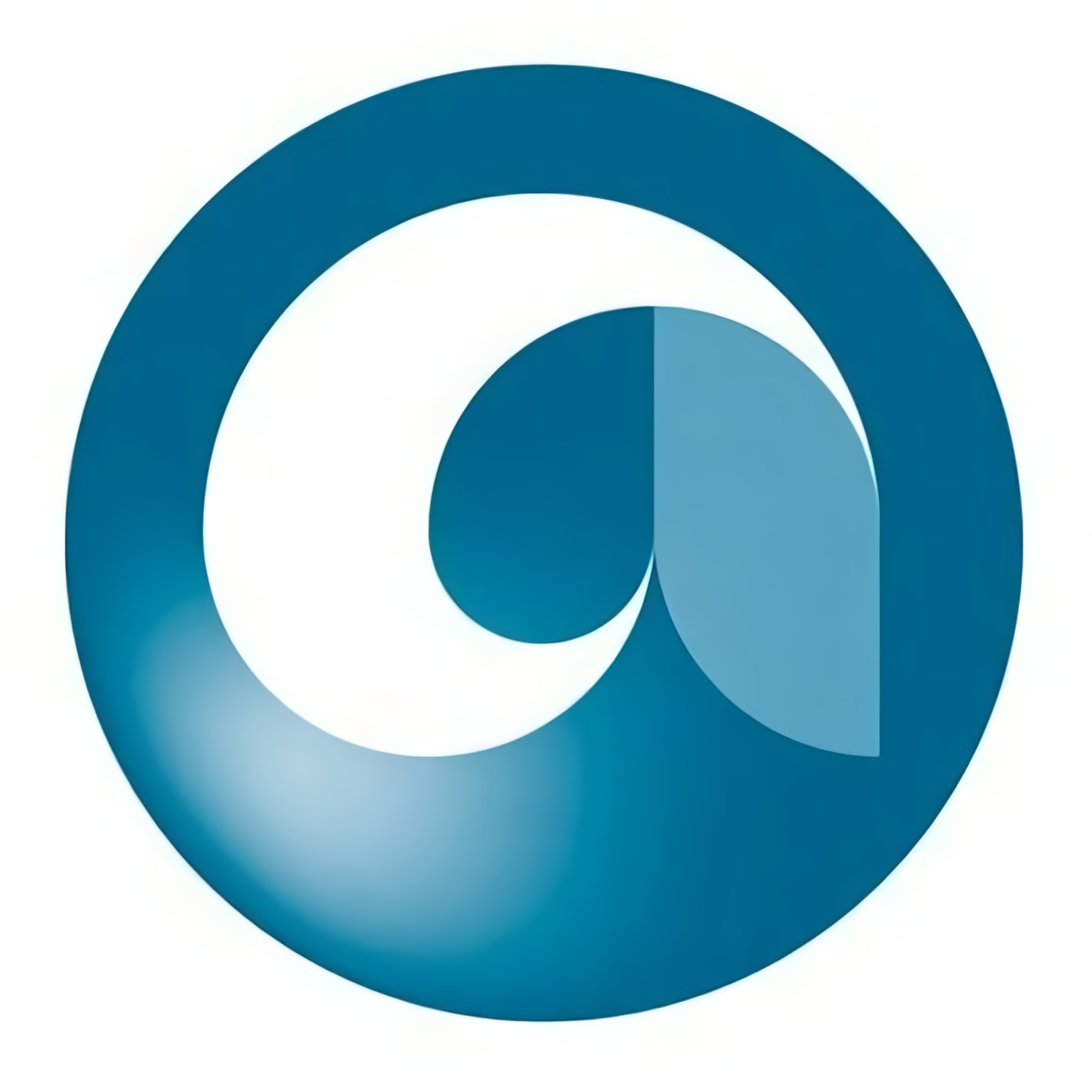
- Founded: May 2011
- Headquarters location: New Delhi, India
- Distribution: South Asia
- Key people: David Davidar; R. K.Mehra; Kapish Mehra
- Publication types: Books
- Official website: alephbookcompany.com

Aleph Book Company is an Indian publishing company. It was founded in May 2011 by David Davidar, a novelist, publisher and former president of Penguin Books Canada, in association with R. K. Mehra and Kapish Mehra of Rupa Publications. The headquarters of the company is situated in New Delhi.

== Genesis ==
On his return to India from Canada where he served as the president of Penguin Canada, David Davidar partnered Rupa Publications to found Aleph Book Company in May 2011. The key people at the time of inception were R. K. Mehra and Kapish Mehra of Rupa Publications, besides Davidar. The headquarters of the company is at New Delhi and the logo was designed by Rymn Massand, an inspiration from Aleph, the first letter of many of the semitic abjads.

== Business profile ==
The company publishes both fiction and non-fiction and has an author profile ranging from lesser known writers to established ones such as Romila Thapar, Shashi Tharoor, Khushwant Singh, Cyrus Mistry, Ruskin Bond, Rajmohan Gandhi and Vikram Seth, among others. With a focus on Indian and other South Asian countries, the company publishes books in various genres including fiction, history, biography, autobiography, current events, reportage, travel, popular science, art, music, nature studies, the environment, business, translations, philosophy, sociology, psychology and popular culture. Some of its publications have received various literary awards such as DSC Prize for South Asian Literature, Sahitya Akademi Award and Ramnath Goenka Award. It regularly publishes its catalog under the title, The Book of Aleph.

== Selected publications ==
- Jeet, Thayil (2018). The Book of Chocolate Saints. [S.l.]: Aleph Book Company. ISBN 9780571336104. OCLC 991683350.
- Ruskin, Bond (2017). Unhurried Tales: My Favourite Novellas. [S.l.]: Aleph Book Company. ISBN 9789386021885. OCLC 1019588593.
- Rai, Raghu (2017). Saint Teresa of Calcutta: A Celebration of Her Life & Legacy. Aleph Book Company. ISBN 978-9382277613.
- Singh, Khushwant (2017). Extraordinary Indians. Aleph Book Company. ISBN 978-9383064731.
- Ruskin Bond (2017). Small Towns, Big Stories: New & Selected Fiction. Aleph. ISBN 978-93-82277-54-5.
- Gandhi, Gopalkrishna (2016). Abolishing the Death Penalty: Why India Should Say No to Capital Punishment. Aleph Book Company. ISBN 978-9382277781.
- Naqvi, Naqvi (2016). Being the Other: The Muslim in India. Aleph Book Company. ISBN 978-9384067229.
- Tharoor, Shashi (2015). India Shastra: Reflections on the Nation in our Time. Aleph Book Company. ISBN 978-9384067281.
- Dutt, Barkha (2015). This Unquiet Land: Stories from India's Fault Lines. Aleph Book Company. ISBN 978-9384067595.
- Mistry, Cyrus (2014). Passion Flower: Seven Stories of Derangement. Aleph Book Company. ISBN 978-9382277170.
- Dai, Mamang (2014). The Black Hill. Aleph Book Company. ISBN 978-9382277231.
- Seth, Vikram (2012). Summer Requiem: A Book of Poems. Aleph Book Company. ISBN 978-0297608745.
- Alter, Stephen (2019). Wild Himalaya: A Natural History of the Greatest Mountain Range on Earth. Aleph Book Company. ISBN 978-9388292771.
