= List of speeches =

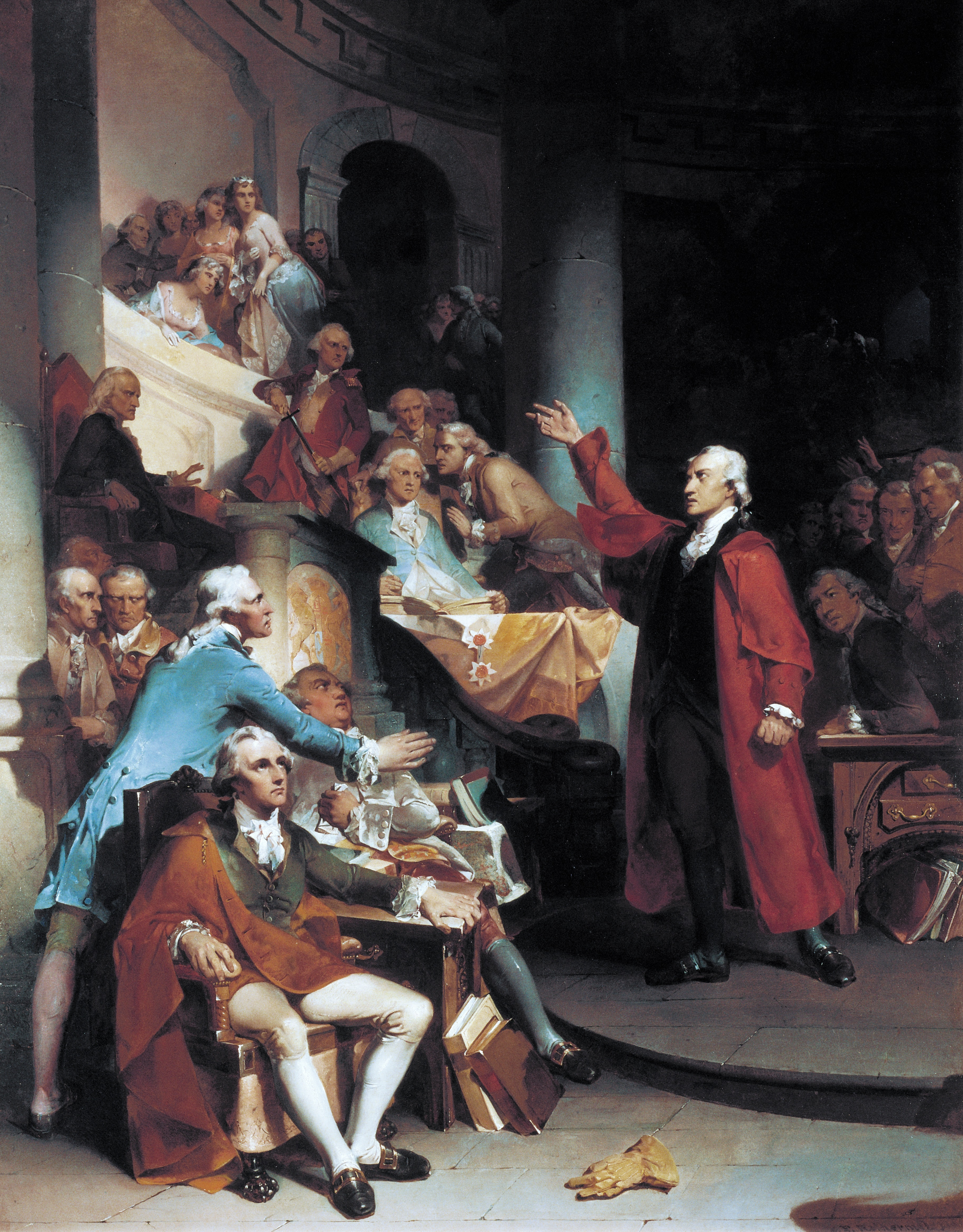
Patrick Henry's speech on the Virginia Resolves at the Capitol in Williamsburg, Virginia, on May 29, 1765

This list of speeches includes those that have gained notability in English or in English translation. The earliest listings may be approximate dates.

== Before the 1st century ==
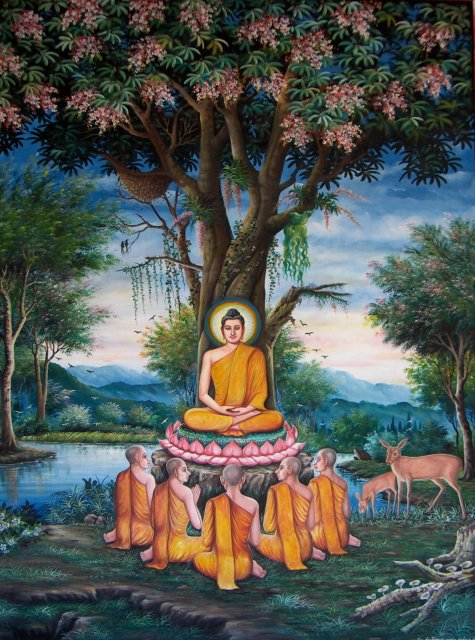
A portrait of the first sermon, Dhammacakkappavattana Sutta, being delivered by The Buddha at Sarnath

- c.570 BC : The Buddha gives his first sermon, Dhammacakkappavattana Sutta, at Sarnath
- 431 BC: "Pericles's Funeral Oration" by the Greek statesman Pericles, significant because it departed from the typical formula of Athenian funeral speeches and was a glorification of Athens' achievements, designed to stir the spirits of a nation at war
- 399 BC: "The Apology of Socrates", Plato's version of the speech given by the philosopher Socrates, defending himself against charges of being a man "who corrupted the young, refused to worship the gods, and created new deities."
- 330 BC: "On the Crown" by the Greek orator Demosthenes, which illustrated the last great phase of political life in Athens
- 63 BC: "Catiline Orations", given by Marcus Tullius Cicero, the consul of Rome, exposing to the Roman Senate the plot of Lucius Sergius Catilina and his friends to overthrow the Roman government
- 44 BC: "The Funeral Oration of Roman Dictator", Julius Caesar, delivered by Mark Antony after his assassination, rephrased by William Shakespeare in Julius Caesar

== Pre-19th century ==
- 30: The Sermon on the Mount, a compilation of the sayings of Jesus, epitomizing his moral teaching.
- 632: The Farewell Sermon, delivered by the Islamic prophet, Muhammad some weeks before his death.
- 1095: Beginning of the Christian Crusades by Pope Urban II at the Council of Clermont.
- 1203: The Baljuna Covenant, an oath sworn by Temüjin, the future Genghis Khan, at his lowest point.
- 1521: The Here I Stand speech of Martin Luther, defending himself at the Diet of Worms.
- 1588: Speech to the Troops at Tilbury by Elizabeth I of England, in preparation for repelling an expected invasion by the Spanish Armada.
- 1599: St Crispin's Day Speech by William Shakespeare as part of his history play Henry V has been famously portrayed by Laurence Olivier to raise British spirits during the Second World War, and by Kenneth Branagh in the 1989 film Henry V, and it made famous the phrase "band of brothers".
- 1601: The Golden Speech by Elizabeth I of England, in which she revealed that it would be her final Parliament and spoke of the respect she had for the country, her position, and the parliamentarians themselves.
- 1630: A Model of Christian Charity by Puritan leader and Massachusetts Governor John Winthrop, in which the phrase "City Upon a Hill" was used and became popular in the North American colonies.
- 1681–1704: The sermons and funeral orations of French bishop and theologian Jacques-Bénigne Bossuet during his tenure as the bishop of Meaux Cathedral, whose sermons preached the divine right of kings during the reign of Louis XIV, and who delivered memorable orations across Europe.
- 1741: Sinners in the Hands of an Angry God, a sermon by theologian Jonathan Edwards, noted for the glimpse it provides into the ideas of the religious Great Awakening of 1730–1755 in the United States.
- 1775: Give Me Liberty or Give Me Death! by U.S. colonial patriot Patrick Henry to the Second Virginia Convention.
- 1791: Abolish the Slave Trade, British Parliamentarian William Wilberforce's four-hour speech to the House of Commons.
- 1792: The Deathless Sermon, given by William Carey during the decline of Hyper-Calvinism in England.
- 1793: The Manifesto of the Enragés, given by Jacques Roux to the National Convention, demanding the abolition of private property and class society in the name of the sans-culottes. Remarkable as an early precursor to socialist and communist thought.

== Nineteenth century ==
- 1803: Speech From the Dock by the Irish nationalist Robert Emmet.
- 1805: Red Jacket's speech defending Native American religion.
- 1823: President James Monroe's State of the Union Address to Congress in which he first stated the Monroe Doctrine.
- 1837: The American Scholar speech given by Ralph Waldo Emerson to the Phi Beta Kappa Society at the First Parish in Cambridge in Cambridge, Massachusetts.
- 1838: Abraham Lincoln's Lyceum Address, delivered to the Young Men's Lyceum of Springfield, Illinois on January 27, 1838, discusses citizenship in a democratic republic and internal threats to its institutions.
- 1838: The "Divinity School Address", a speech Ralph Waldo Emerson gave to the graduating class of Harvard Divinity School.
- 1851: Ain't I A Woman?, extemporaneously delivered by abolitionist Sojourner Truth at a Women's Convention in Akron, Ohio.
- 1854: The Peoria speech, made in Peoria, Illinois on October 16, 1854, was with its specific arguments against slavery, an important step in Abraham Lincoln's political ascension.
- 1856: The Crime against Kansas speech was delivered on the US Senate floor on May 19–20, 1856 by Senator Charles Sumner of Massachusetts, a radical Republican, about the conflicts in "bleeding Kansas."
- 1858: A House Divided, in which candidate for the U.S. Senate Abraham Lincoln, speaking of the pre-Civil War United States, quoted Matthew 12:25 and said, "A house divided against itself cannot stand."
- 1858: American Infidelity, an anti-slavery speech delivered in the United States Congress by Joshua Giddings
- 1859: Abolitionist John Brown's last speech.
- 1860: Cooper Union Address by candidate for U.S. President Abraham Lincoln, in which Lincoln elaborated his views on slavery, affirming that he did not wish it to be expanded into the western territories and claiming that the Founding Fathers would agree with this position.
- 1861: The Cornerstone speech by Alexander Stephens, vice president of the Confederate States of America, in which he set forth the differences between the constitution of the Confederacy and that of the United States, laid out causes for the American Civil War, and defended slavery.
- 1861: Abraham Lincoln's First Inaugural Address, on the eve of the American Civil War.
- 1861: Abraham Lincoln's Fourth of July Address, a written statement sent to the U.S. Congress, recounts the initial stages of the American Civil War and sets out Abraham Lincoln's analysis of the southern slave states rebellion as well as Lincoln's thoughts on the war and American society.

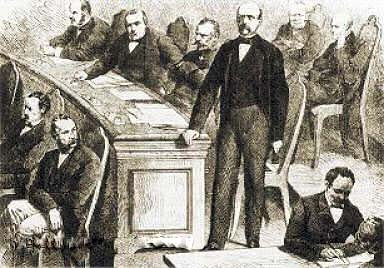
Otto von Bismarck in the North German Parliament

- 1862: The Blood and Iron speech by Prussian Minister-President Otto von Bismarck on the unification of Germany.
- 1863: The Gettysburg Address by Abraham Lincoln, resolving that government "of the people, by the people, for the people, shall not perish from the earth."
- 1865: Lincoln's Second Inaugural, in which the President sought to avoid harsh treatment of the defeated South.
- 1873: The "Is it a Crime for a Citizen of the United States to Vote?" speech by Susan B. Anthony, who in her effort to introduce women's suffrage into the United States asked her fellow citizens "how can the “consent of the governed” be given if the right to vote be denied?"
- 1877: The Surrender of Nez Perce Chief Joseph, pledging to "fight no more forever."
- 1880: Dostoyevsky's Pushkin Speech, a speech delivered by Fyodor Dostoyevsky in honour of the Russian poet Alexander Pushkin.
- 1890–1900s: Acres of Diamonds speeches by Temple University President Russell Conwell, the central idea of which was that the resources to achieve all good things were present in one's own community.
- 1893: Swami Vivekananda's address at the World Parliament of Religions in Chicago, in which the Indian sage introduced Hinduism to North America.
- 1895: The Atlanta Exposition Speech, an address on the topic of race relations given by Booker T. Washington.
- 1896: Cross of Gold by U.S. presidential candidate William Jennings Bryan, advocating bimetallism.

== Twentieth century ==
=== Pre-World War I and World War I ===
- 1900: Hun Speech by Wilhelm II, the emperor's reaction to the Boxer Rebellion in which he demands to counter the insurgency with brutal force (like the Huns).
- 1901: Votes for Women, by the American writer Mark Twain.
- 1906: I warn the Government, by Conservative member F.E. Smith in the British House of Commons.
- 1910: The Man in the Arena, by U.S. President Theodore Roosevelt, quoted by President Richard Nixon and cited by South Africa President Nelson Mandela.
- 1915: Ireland Unfree Shall Never Be at Peace, by Irish Nationalist Patrick Pearse, significant in the lead-up to the Easter Rising of 1916.
- 1917: War Message to Congress by U.S. President Woodrow Wilson.
- 1917: The April Theses, a series of ten directives issued by Vladimir Lenin upon his return to Petrograd from his exile in Switzerland
- 1918: Fourteen Points by Woodrow Wilson, laying out the terms for the end of World War I.

=== Inter-war years and World War II ===
- 1930: Allahabad Address by Muhammad Iqbal. Presented the idea of a separate homeland for Indian Muslims which was ultimately realized in the form of Pakistan.
- 1932: The Bomber Will Always Get Through. a phrase used by English statesman Stanley Baldwin in a House of Commons speech, "A Fear For The Future."
- 1933: You Cannot Take Our Honour by Otto Wels, the only German Parliamentarian to speak against the Enabling Act, which took the power of legislation away from the Parliament and handed it to Adolf Hitler's cabinet.
- 1933: The Only Thing We Have to Fear Is Fear Itself, from the first inaugural address of U.S. President Franklin Delano Roosevelt.
- 1933: Atatürk's Tenth Year Speech, given by the President Mustafa Kemal Atatürk in Ankara Hippodrome.
- 1934: Every Man A King, a phrase used in many speeches by Louisiana Governor Huey Long.
- 1934: Speech of Gallipoli by Mustafa Kemal Atatürk
- 1936: Address to the League of Nations by the Emperor Haile Selassie I of Ethiopia on the invasion of his country by Benito Mussolini of Italy.
- 1936: Unamuno's Last Lecture by Miguel de Unamuno, in which he criticized the Spanish Nationalists.
- 1939: The Luckiest Man on the Face of the Earth, by baseball player Lou Gehrig upon his retirement from the New York Yankees.
- 1939: King George VI of the United Kingdom delivers a radio address at the outbreak of World War II calling for his subjects in Britain and the Empire to stand firm in the dark days ahead.
- 1939: Reichstag Speech, also known as Hitler's prophecy speech. Amid rising international tensions Adolf Hitler tells the German public and the world that the outbreak of war would mean the end of European Jewry.
- 1940: The Presidential address by Muhammad Ali Jinnah to the All India Muslim League's session in Lahore, 1940 on passing of Lahore Resolution also known as Pakistan Resolution.(Transcript.)
- 1940: The Norway Debate speeches, where Neville Chamberlain, Winston Churchill defended the Chamberlain government's war policies Clement Attlee, Archibald Sinclair, Roger Keyes, Leo Amery, Arthur Greenwood, Herbert Morrison, David Lloyd George, and others.
- 1940: The Appeal of 18 June, French leader Charles de Gaulle's radio broadcast from London, the beginning of the Resistance to German occupation during World War II.
- 1940: Blood, Toil, Tears, and Sweat, a phrase used by U.S. President Theodore Roosevelt in 1897 but popularized by Winston Churchill in the first of three inspirational radio addresses during the opening months of World War II.
- 1940: We Shall Fight on the Beaches, from the second radio talk by Winston Churchill, promising to never surrender.
- 1940: This Was Their Finest Hour, the third address by Winston Churchill, giving a confident view of the military situation and rallying the British people.
- 1940: Never Was So Much Owed by So Many to So Few by Winston Churchill, speaking in another radio talk about the air and naval defenders of Great Britain.
- 1940: The final speech in The Great Dictator by Charlie Chaplin in the role of a Jewish barber, in which he demanded solidarity between all people and a return to values like peace, empathy and freedom.
- 1940: Arsenal of Democracy, a radio address by U.S. President Franklin Delano Roosevelt, who warned against a sense of complacency if Britain were to fall to the Axis powers.
- 1941: Three Sermons in Defiance of the Nazis, in which German Bishop Clemens August Graf von Galen issued forceful, public denunciations of Nazi Germany's euthanasia programs and persecution of the Catholic Church.
- 1941: Four Freedoms, in which Franklin Delano Roosevelt outlined goals for peace but called for a massive build-up of U.S. arms production.
- 1941: A Date Which Will Live in Infamy, post-Pearl Harbor speech to the U.S. Congress in which Franklin Delano Roosevelt called for a declaration of war against Japan.
- 1941: Declaration of war against United States by the German Führer, German Chancellor, and Führer of the Nazi Party, Adolf Hitler, in which he announced Germany has declared war on the United States.
- 1942: Quit India by Mohandas K. Gandhi also known as Mahatma Gandhi, calling for determined, but nonviolent, resistance against British colonial rule.
- 1942: The Forgotten People by the Australian Liberal Party leader Sir Robert Menzies, defining and exalting the nation's middle class.
- 1942: Slovak, cast off your parasite! by Jozef Tiso, president of the Slovak State, defending Slovakia's role in the Holocaust.
- 1942: Hitler's Stalingrad speech by the German Führer, German Chancellor, and Führer of the Nazi Party, Adolf Hitler, talking about the ongoing Battle of Stalingrad.
- 1943: Do You Want Total War? by Nazi propaganda minister Joseph Goebbels, who exhorted the Germans to continue the war even though it would be long and difficult.
- 1943: A page of glory...never to be written were two secret speeches made by Reichsführer-SS Heinrich Himmler in which for the first time a high-ranking member of the Nazi government spoke openly of the ongoing extermination of the European Jews.
- 1944: The First Bayeux speech, delivered by General Charles de Gaulle of France in the context of liberation after the Normandy landings.
- 1944: Patton's Speech, a profanity-laden speech to the United States Third Army by United States General George S. Patton, calling for the troops' bravery in spite of their fears. It was given prior to the Normandy landings.
- 1944: Paris Liberated by Charles de Gaulle on the day he took up governmental duties at the War Ministry in Paris.
- 1945: Hirohito surrender broadcast (Gyokuon-hōsō), recorded by Japanese Emperor Hirohito and broadcast as an unconditional capitulation to the Allies.

=== 1945–1991 Cold War years ===
- 1946: Sinews of Peace by Winston Churchill, introducing the phrase Iron Curtain to describe the division between eastern and western Europe.

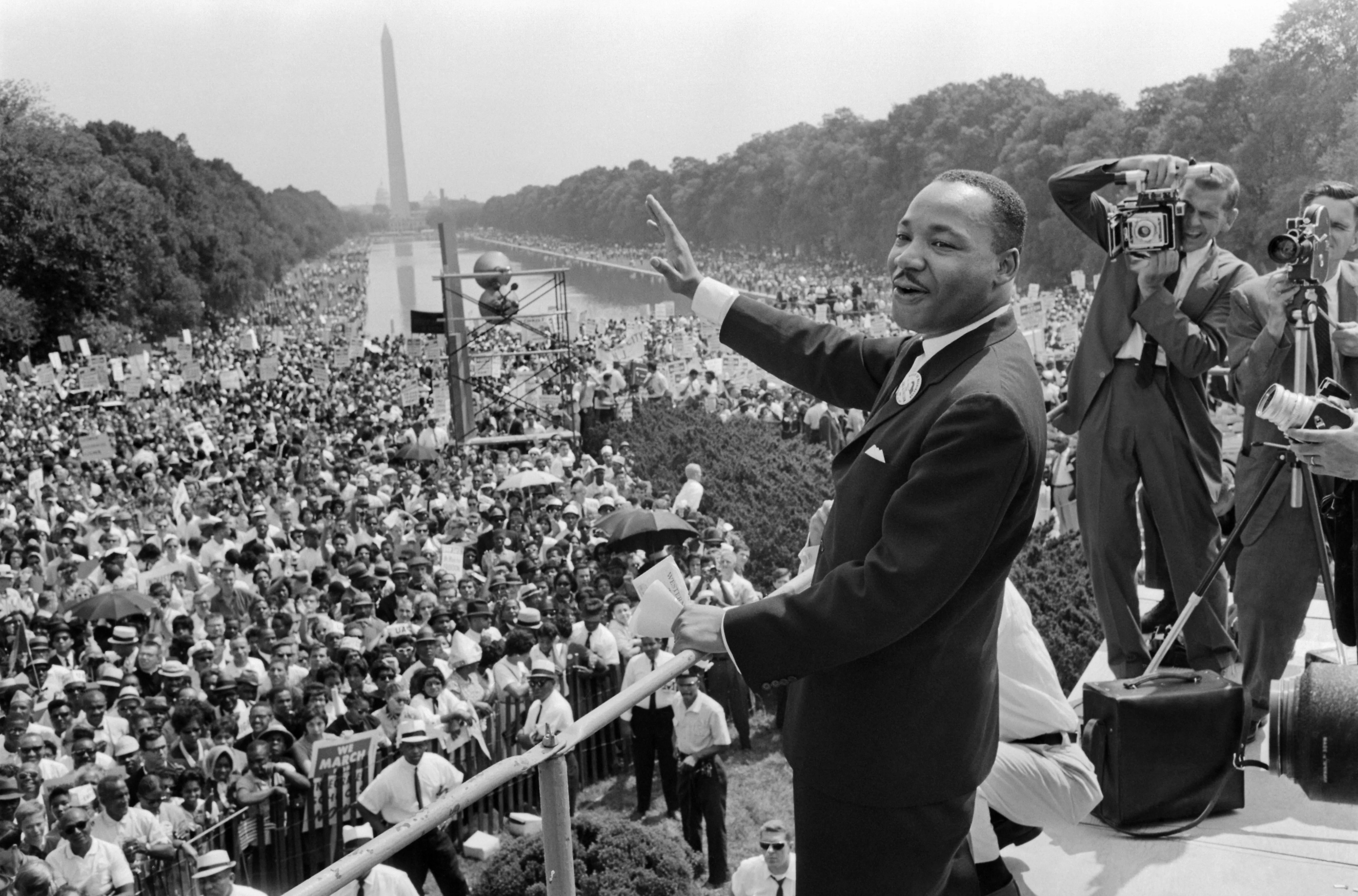
Civil Rights Movement leader Martin Luther King after delivering his "I Have a Dream" speech at the 1963 March on Washington.

- 1946: The Second Bayeux speech, delivered by General Charles de Gaulle describing the postwar constitution of France.
- 1947: A speech to the Commonwealth by the then Princess Elizabeth on her 21st Birthday, broadcast from South Africa.
- 1947: The Marshall Plan speech given at Harvard University by U.S. Secretary of State George C. Marshall, introducing an effort to offer financial assistance to rebuild Europe after World War II.
- 1947: Muhammad Ali Jinnah's 11 August Speech on the eve of independence from Britain about the struggle for Pakistan, injustices in partition, future road map for running the country, justice, equality and religious freedom for all.
- 1947: Tryst with Destiny by Jawaharlal Nehru, given on the eve of Indian independence and concerning the country's history.
- 1948: The Light Has Gone Out of Our Lives by Jawaharlal Nehru, about the assassination of Mohandas K. Gandhi also known as Mahatma Gandhi.
- 1949: Four Points by U.S. President Harry Truman, setting his postwar goals.
- 1949: The Light on the Hill by Australia Prime Minister Ben Chifley, paying tribute to the country's labour movement.
- 1950: The Declaration of Conscience, a speech made by U.S. Senator Margaret Chase Smith calling for the country to re-examine the tactics used by the House Un-American Activities Committee.
- 1951: Old Soldiers Never Die by U.S. General Douglas MacArthur in an appearance before Congress after being fired by President Truman as Supreme Commander in the Korean War
- 1952: The political Checkers speech by U.S. vice-presidential candidate Richard M. Nixon, in which he mentioned his family's pet dog of that name.
- 1953: The Chance for Peace was an address by U.S. President Dwight D. Eisenhower shortly after the death of Soviet leader Joseph Stalin that highlighted the cost of the US–Soviet rivalry to both nations.
- 1953: History Will Absolve Me, a four-hour judicial defense by revolutionary Fidel Castro on charges of leading an attack on Cuban Army barracks.
- 1953: Atoms for Peace, an address by Eisenhower on the creation of an international body to both regulate and promote the peaceful use of atomic power.
- 1956: On the Personality Cult and its Consequences by Soviet leader Nikita Khrushchev, castigating actions taken by the regime of deceased Communist Party secretary Joseph Stalin. Widely known as the "Secret Speech" because it was delivered at a closed session of that year's Communist Party Congress.
- 1956: We Will Bury You by Nikita Khrushchev, addressing Western ambassadors at a reception in the Polish embassy in Moscow.
- 1957: Longest Speech in the United Nations by Indian delegate V.K. Krishna Menon.
- 1957: Give Us the Ballot by Martin Luther King Jr., an appeal for voting rights made at the Prayer Pilgrimage for Freedom at the Lincoln Memorial
- 1959: There's Plenty of Room at the Bottom by physicist Richard Feynman, on the possibility of direct manipulation of individual atoms as a new form of chemical synthesis.
- 1960: Address to the Greater Houston Ministerial Association" by then-candidate John F. Kennedy in Houston, Texas, to address fears that his being a member of the Catholic Church would impact his decision-making as President.
- 1960: Wind of Change speech by British Prime Minister Harold Macmillan in South Africa, in which Macmillan reiterated his support for the decolonization of Africa.
- 1960: Congolese Independence speech by Congolese independence leader and its first democratically elected Prime Minister Patrice Lumumba in South Africa, in which he described the suffering of the Congolese under Belgian colonialism and the negatives that lay behind the pageantry and paternalism of the Belgian "civilising mission" begun by Leopold II in the Congo Free State.
- 1961: Eisenhower's farewell address, a speech at the end of the term of President Dwight D. Eisenhower, in which he warned of the rise of the "military–industrial complex" in the United States.
- 1961: Ask Not What Your Country Can Do For You, the inaugural address of U.S. President John F. Kennedy, in which he advised his "fellow Americans" to "ask not what your country can do for you – ask what you can do for your country."
- 1961: The Vast Wasteland speech by Newton Minow, chairman of the U.S. Federal Communications Commission, in which he asserted that "when television is bad, nothing is worse."
- 1962: Richard Nixon turned his concession speech in the California gubernatorial election into a 15-minute monologue aimed mainly at the press, famously (though as it turned out, prematurely) stating "...you don't have Nixon to kick around any more, because, gentlemen, this is my last press conference."
- 1962: The "We choose to go to the Moon" speech by U.S President John F. Kennedy to drum up public support for the Apollo Program at Rice University, where he reiterated his commitment to reaching the Moon by the end of the decade.
- 1963: Segregation Now, Segregation Tomorrow, Segregation Forever by Alabama Governor George Wallace, which became a rallying cry for those opposed to racial integration and the U.S. civil rights movement.
- 1963: I Am Prepared To Die by South African leader Nelson Mandela at his trial in which he laid out the reasoning for using violence as a tactic against apartheid.
- 1963: American University Speech by U.S. President John F. Kennedy to construct a better relationship with the Soviet Union and to prevent another threat of nuclear war after the events of the Cuban Missile Crisis in October 1962.
- 1963: Report to the American People on Civil Rights by John F. Kennedy speaking from the Oval Office.
- 1963: Ich Bin Ein Berliner ("I am a Berliner") by U.S. President John F. Kennedy, voicing support for the people of West Berlin.
- 1963: I Have a Dream, Lincoln Memorial speech by Martin Luther King Jr. in which the civil rights leader called for racial equality and an end to discrimination.
- 1964: The Ballot or the Bullet by Nation of Islam leader Malcolm X, urging African-Americans to exercise their right to vote but warning that if they were prevented from attaining equality, it might be necessary to take up arms.
- 1964: A Time for Choosing, the stock campaign speech that Ronald Reagan made on behalf of Republican presidential candidate Barry Goldwater.
- 1964: Speech at the United Nations in 1964 by Cuban revolutionary leader Ernesto "Che" Guevara.
- 1964: "Bodies upon the gears" speech by American activist and a key member in the Berkeley Free Speech Movement, Mario Savio.
- 1965: The American Promise by U.S. President Lyndon B. Johnson, urging the United States Congress to pass a voting rights act prohibiting discrimination in voting on account of race and color in wake of the Bloody Sunday.
- 1965: How Long, Not Long by Martin Luther King Jr. at the conclusion of the Selma to Montgomery march.
- 1966: Day of Affirmation by U.S. Senator Robert F. Kennedy, speaking to South African students about individual liberty, apartheid, and the need for civil rights in the United States.
- 1967: Beyond Vietnam: A Time to Break Silence, Martin Luther King Jr.'s anti-Vietnam War speech at Riverside Church in New York City.
- 1967: Vive le Québec libre ("Long live free Quebec"), a phrase ending a speech by French President Charles de Gaulle in Montreal, Canada. The slogan became popular among those wishing to show their support for Quebec sovereignty.
- 1968: I've Been to the Mountaintop, the last speech delivered by civil rights leader Martin Luther King Jr.
- 1968: The death of Martin Luther King Jr. by U.S. Senator Robert F. Kennedy.
- 1968: Robert F. Kennedy's speech, On the Mindless Menace of Violence.
- 1968: A Good and Decent Man, the funeral eulogy for Robert F. Kennedy by his younger brother, U.S. Senator Ted Kennedy.
- 1968: Rivers of Blood by United Kingdom Conservative Enoch Powell about immigration.
- 1971: This Time the Struggle Is for Our Freedom by Bengali nationalist leader Sheikh Mujibur Rahman, regarded by many in Bangladesh as a de facto declaration of independence.
- 1971: Address to the Women of America by feminist leader Gloria Steinem. Not only did the speech address the issues of sexism and misogyny, but also those of racism and social class.
- 1973: Salvador Allende's last speech addressing the country before his death during the September 11th, 1973 CIA-backed coup d'état in Chile.
- 1974: I Have Never Been a Quitter, the resignation speech of U.S. President Richard M. Nixon.
- 1974: Sheikh Mujibur Rahman's speech at the United Nations after Bangladesh got full membership of the United Nations.
- 1975: No More Than a Piece of Paper, the Israeli response to United Nations General Assembly Resolution 3379, that Zionism is "a form of racism and racial discrimination," delivered by Ambassador Chaim Herzog.
- 1975: Nothing will save the governor-general, Australian Prime Minister Gough Whitlam's reaction to the dissolution of parliament following his dismissal by the Governor-General of Australia John Kerr.
- 1979: A speech on U.S. energy policy by President Jimmy Carter speaks of a "crisis of confidence" among the country's public, and comes to be known as the "malaise" speech, despite Carter not using that word in the address.
- 1983: Evil Empire, a phrase used in speeches by U.S. President Ronald Reagan to refer to the Soviet Union.
- 1987: Tear Down This Wall, the challenge made at the Brandenburg Gate by U.S. President Ronald Reagan to Soviet leader Mikhail Gorbachev to destroy the Berlin Wall.
- 1987: Today and Forever, Quebec Premier Robert Bourassa's reaction to the failure of the Meech Lake Accord on the Canadian Constitution.
- 1988: Sermon on the Mound, in which British Prime Minister Margaret Thatcher offered a theological justification for her ideas on capitalism.
- 1989: The Gazimestan speech, in which Serbian President Slobodan Milošević warned of "armed battles" in the future of Yugoslavia.
- 1989: Deng Xiaoping delivered "Speech Made While Receiving Cadres of the Martial Law Units in the Capitol at and Above the Army Level" in response to the Tiananmen Square protests of 1989.
- 1990: Their Bats Have Been Broken, the resignation speech of Geoffrey Howe as deputy prime minister in the Margaret Thatcher government of the United Kingdom.
- 1991: A speech by U.S. President George Bush to the Ukrainian parliament, encouraging Ukraine to remain in the then-disintegrating Soviet Union, caused an uproar among Ukrainian nationalists and American conservatives, with commentator William Safire dubbing it the Chicken Kiev speech.

=== 1992–2000 Post Cold War years ===
- 1992: Culture War speech by U.S. conservative Presidential candidate Pat Buchanan, in which he described "a religious war going on in our country for the soul of America."
- 1992: The Redfern Park speech delivered by then Prime Minister of Australia, Paul Keating; the first public acknowledgement by an Australian prime minister of the prejudice and discrimination practised by Europeans against Aboriginal Australians and Torres Strait Islanders, the Indigenous peoples of Australia.
- 1995: The concession speech of Quebec Premier Jacques Parizeau after the narrow defeat of the 1995 Quebec independence referendum, in which he blamed the loss on "money and ethnic votes," also translated into English as "money and the ethnic vote."
- 1996: I Am an African by South African Deputy President Thabo Mbeki on the adoption of a new Constitution for the country.
- 1996: Clinton's renomination speech at the 1996 Democratic National Convention by United States President Bill Clinton, in which he became the first president to use the word "gay" in a Democratic National Convention.
- 1999: State of the Union Address by United States President Bill Clinton, in which he became the first president to use the words "sexual orientation" in a State of the Union Address.
- 1999: Elie Wiesel's: "The Perils of Indifference" Speech, which he gave in front of President of the United States Bill Clinton.

== Twenty-first century ==
- 2001: U.S. President George W. Bush's Address to the Nation on September 11, 2001. (Transcript.)
- 2002: State of the Union Address by United States President George W. Bush, in which he declared that the Democratic People's Republic of Korea, the Islamic Republic of Iran, and the Iraqi Republic were part of an "Axis of evil".
- 2003: Iraq War Eve-of-Battle speech by British Lieutenant Colonel Tim Collins.
- 2003: Mission Accomplished speech by United States President George W. Bush, in which he declared the end to major combat operations in Iraq.
- 2004: U.S. Democratic National Convention Keynote address by Illinois State Senator Barack Obama, which helped him become nationally known.
- 2004: Pound Cake speech by African American entertainer Bill Cosby, in which he criticized several significant aspects of modern African American culture.
- 2005: Apple Inc. CEO Steve Jobs Stanford Commencement Address. (Transcript / Video.)
- 2005: The Art, Truth and Politics Nobel Lecture delivered on video by the 2005 Nobel Laureate in Literature Harold Pinter
- 2006: The Őszöd speech, a strident and obscenity-laden speech made by Hungarian Prime Minister Ferenc Gyurcsány to fellow members of the Hungarian Socialist Party in Balatonőszöd. The speech, intended to be confidential, was leaked to the media and led to mass protests.
- 2006: Chocolate City speech by New Orleans Mayor Ray Nagin, concerning race politics in the city several months after Hurricane Katrina.
- 2007: The Last Lecture, delivered by Randy Pausch, a terminally ill computer science professor at Carnegie Mellon University, which became an Internet sensation and gained major media coverage.
- 2008: The "Sorry" speech, delivered by Australian Prime Minister Kevin Rudd, regarding the Stolen Generations – children of Australian Aboriginal and Torres Strait Islander descent who were removed from their families by the Australian Federal and State government agencies and church missions, under acts of their respective parliaments, in the 1860s through to the 1960s. (Transcript / Video.)
- 2008: A More Perfect Union, in which U.S. Presidential candidate Barack Obama responded to controversial remarks made by the Reverend Jeremiah Wright, his former pastor.
- 2008: Barack Obama's Election Victory speech in Grant Park, Chicago, Illinois.
- 2009: A New Beginning, a speech made by U.S. President Barack Obama which was designed to reframe relations between the Islamic world and the United States after the terrorist attacks of Sept. 11, 2001, and the U.S.-led war in Iraq. The President gave this speech in Cairo, Egypt, outlining his personal commitment to engagement with the Muslim world, based upon mutual interests and mutual respect, and discusses how the United States and Muslim communities around the world can bridge some of the differences that have divided them.
- 2010: Two Tigers take turns tasting Tapioca speech by Captain Underpants
- 2011: Death of Osama Bin Laden speech by U.S. President Barack Obama.
- 2012: Clint Eastwood's Empty Chair Speech at the 2012 Republican National Convention.
- 2012: Misogyny speech made by Australian Prime Minister Julia Gillard on October 9, 2012 in reaction to alleged sexism from opposition leader Tony Abbott. (Transcript / Video.)
- 2015: State of the Union Address by United States President Barack Obama, in which he became the first president to use the words "lesbian", "gay", "bisexual", and "transgender" in a State of the Union Address.
- 2015: Barack Obama Selma 50th anniversary speech, honoring the 1965 Selma to Montgomery marches.
- 2015: Shashi Tharoor Oxford Union speech, Indian Diplomat, Writer and MP Shashi Tharoor delivered a speech "Britain owes reparations to her former colonies". Tharoor began his speech by arguing that the economic progress of Britain from the 18th-century onwards was financed by the economic exploitation and deindustrialisation of British India. He cited other negative effects of colonial rule on India, such as famines and the mandatory contribution of Indians toward the British war effort during the First and Second World Wars. Scholar Alyssa Ayres, who served on the Council on Foreign Relations, reasoned that Tharoor's quantification of the colonial exploitation of India formed the most important part of his speech. British Labour MP Keith Vaz praised the speech, calling for the return of the Kohinoor diamond to India.
- 2017: On the Removal of Four Confederate Monuments by New Orleans Mayor Mitch Landrieu, which defended the ongoing removal of Confederate States of America monuments in the city of New Orleans. (Transcript)
- 2024: Speech by Javier Milei at the UN Assembly (at the United Nations General Assembly)
- 2025: Speech by JD Vance at the Munich Security Conference, criticizing the leadership of the European Union
- 2025: 2025 Donald Trump speech at the United Nations by Donald Trump at the UN General Assembly, criticizing the existence of the United Nations.
- 2026: 2026 Mark Carney World Economic Forum speech by Canadian Prime Minister Mark Carney, responding to expansionist and isolationist foreign policies during the second Trump administration.
