= Shashi Tharoor's Oxford Union speech =

2015 speech

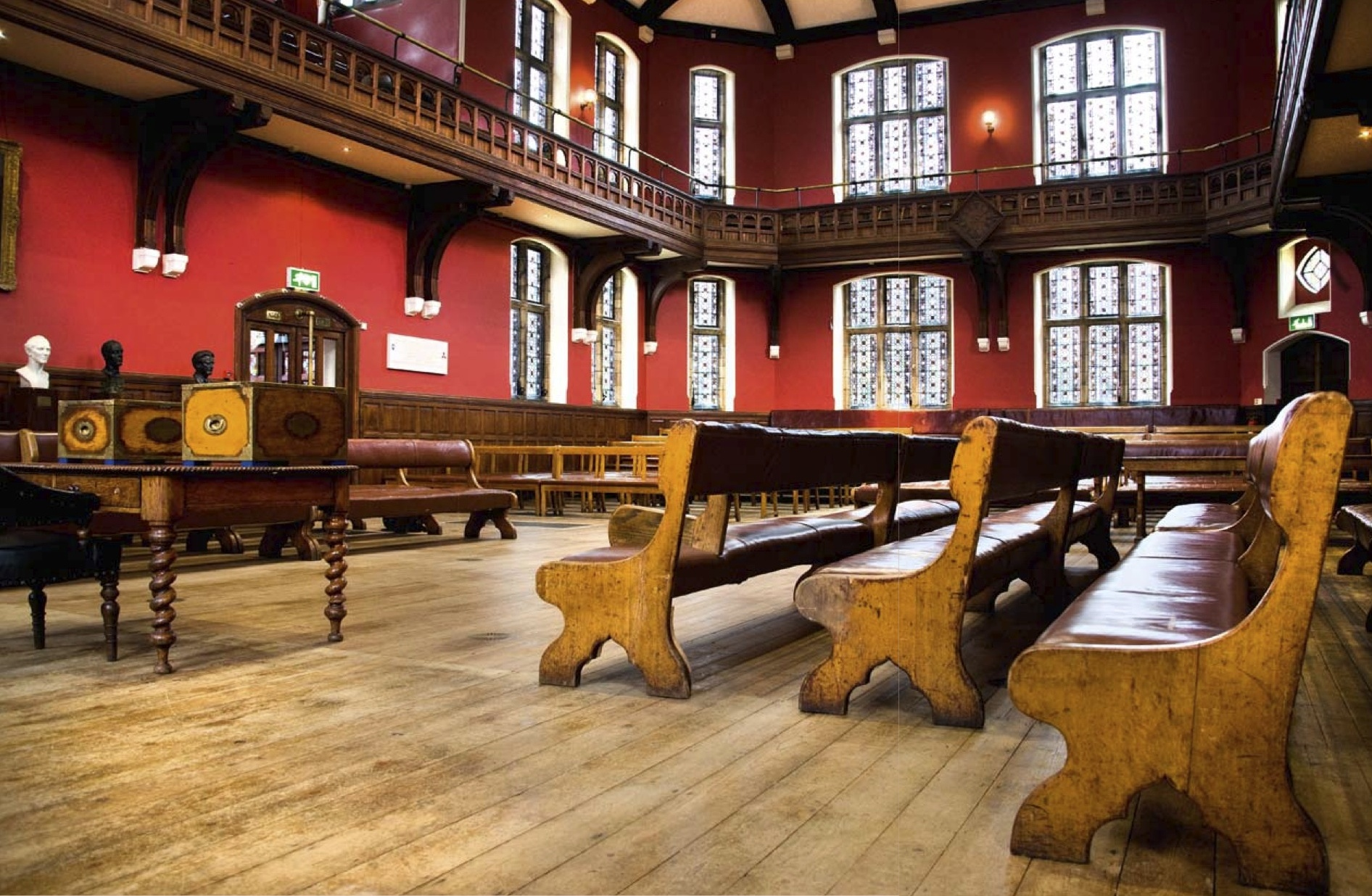
The Oxford Union debating chamber

During a debate at the Oxford Union on 28 May 2015, the Indian Member of Parliament, diplomat and writer Shashi Tharoor delivered a speech supporting the motion "Britain owes reparations to her former colonies". Tharoor was the seventh speaker in the debate, the final speaker from the proposition, and spoke for about fifteen minutes. While criticising the opposition, he argued that British colonial rule damaged the Indian economy.

Tharoor began his speech by arguing that the economic progress of Britain from the 18th-century onwards was financed by the economic exploitation and de-industrialisation of British India. He cited other negative effects of colonial rule on India, such as famines and the mandatory contribution of Indians toward the British war effort during the First and Second World Wars. Tharoor argued that supposed benefits of British colonialism, such as railways and democracy, were either constructed for the purposes of furthering economic exploitation or devised by Indians themselves. He ended his speech by suggesting that Britain pay one pound sterling per annum for the next two centuries as symbolic reparation. The side in favour of the motion won, with 185 votes to 56.

Once the debate was uploaded onto YouTube, Tharoor's speech went viral, especially in India. (Note: As of August 2021, the video had nearly 8.3 million views on the official Oxford Union YouTube channel.) The Indian Prime Minister Narendra Modi's brief comments on the debate were seen as endorsing reparations from the British by some commentators. Several responses to the speech were subsequently published; these included charges of hypocrisy and criticism of Tharoor's claims. Tharoor wrote the non-fiction work Inglorious Empire: What the British Did to India (2017), expanding upon the arguments in his speech.

== Background ==
=== Oxford Union Society ===
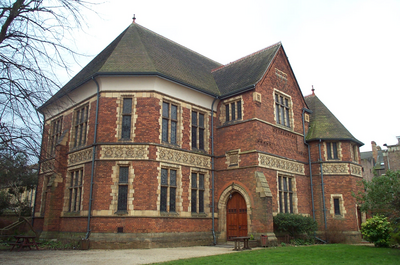
The Oxford Union debating chamber, built in 1878, is a "free-standing" building, with a seating capacity of 450.

The Oxford Union Society, commonly referred to as the Oxford Union or the Union, was formed in 1823 as a debating society in Oxford, England. Life membership is paid-for and restricted to students and alumni at the University of Oxford, though students at Oxford Brookes University and several other educational institutions in the city can pay for membership for the duration of their studies. Though most students purchase life membership upon arriving at the university, few regularly attend debates; the society has been described as not figuring "very prominently in the life of the average Oxford undergraduate".

Soon after its foundation, members realised that debating popular and controversial topics would help to ensure the society's survival. One of the most significant debates concerned the motion "That the present ministry is incompetent to carry on the government of the country". Taking place in 1831, it established the Union's reputation for engaging with topical political issues and nurturing the oratorical skills of future politicians; a young William Ewart Gladstone was offered a seat in parliament because of his performance in that debate. During the 19th and early 20th century, the national press often reported on controversial Union debates, most prominently the "King and Country" debate of 1933. Despite concerns over the society's elitism, in 2007 The Guardian noted that "if most students care little about the Union ... the rest of the world certainly does, and always has done". It continues to attract a diverse range of speakers, including politicians, singers, sportspersons, scientists and actors.

=== Shashi Tharoor ===
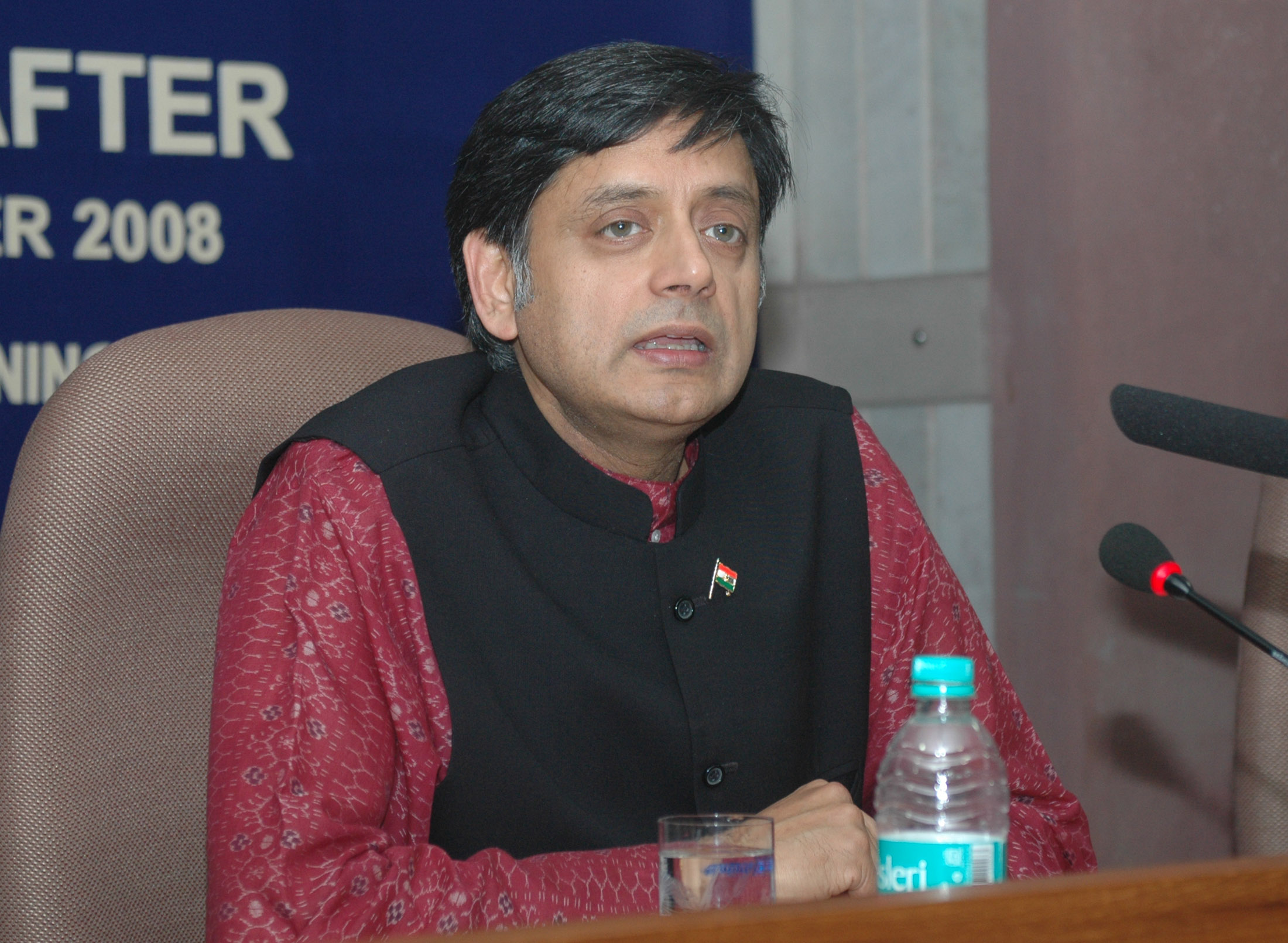
Tharoor in 2008

Shashi Tharoor is an Indian politician, diplomat and writer who serves as a Member of Parliament in the House of the People of the Indian Parliament, having formerly been the Under-Secretary General of the United Nations. In an interview with Elle in 2017, Tharoor described his debating career at St. Stephen's College, University of Delhi; participating in debates from his first year onwards, he said that he went to compete at Hindu College, Lady Shri Ram College and the Delhi School of Economics. Also a best-selling author, he wrote a quiz for BuzzFeed in which readers were able to test their vocabulary against his.

=== Motion and speakers ===
A debate was organised at the Union in 2015, with the motion being "This house believes Britain owes reparations to her former colonies", with the premise:

We have recently seen former colonies demanding reparations for centuries of abuse: from the Mau Mau survivors in Kenya to descendants of slaves in the Caribbean. David Cameron made controversial remarks on the issue in Amritsar; William Hague said outright that there should be no post-colonial guilt; and Ken Livingstone gave a heartfelt apology for London's role in the slave trade. Do British politicians owe more than just their words?

— Trinity 2015 Termbook, pg 16

Guests invited to speak for the proposition included the Jamaican politician Aloun Ndombet-Assamba, Ghanaian economist George Ayittey (Note: Not present.) and Tharoor. The opposition included the English politician Sir Richard Ottaway, Scottish historian John M. MacKenzie and American historian William Roger Louis. Student speakers included Henna Dattani and Ssuuna Golooba-Mutebi (for the proposition), and Alpha Lee (against the proposition). Tharoor was the seventh speaker in the debate, the final speaker from the proposition, and was allotted eight minutes to make his speech. (Note: Despite this, he spoke for roughly seven more minutes than was allotted.) The debate was scheduled to be held on 28 May 2015 at 8:30 p.m.

== Debate ==
External videos
- Dr Shashi Tharoor MP - Britain Does Owe Reparations, Oxford Union on YouTube
- Oxford Union - Does Britain Owe Reparations playlist on YouTube

Arguments in favour of the proposition began with the first speaker, Dattani, who argued that reparations "go far beyond cash payments" and were "centred on recognising past injustices and redressing the moral imbalance brought on by colonisation". Golooba-Mutebi, the second speaker for the proposition and the third to speak, pre-empted claims that the British colonisation of Africa was carried out to provide modern infrastructure; calling this "fallacious", he noted the existence of "languages, kingdoms and intellectuals" in Africa prior to colonisation.

Ottaway, arguing for the opposition, said that it was impossible to quantify reparations. He argued that demands for reparations were part of an "inferiority complex" among formerly colonised countries: "to ask today's tax payers to finance reparations to the free citizens of independent states merely assuages at 21st century guilt". His speech was interrupted by an attendee claiming that Ottaway's rejection of claims for reparation was part a "superiority complex" that "allowed colonialism and imperialism to happen in the first place".

The next speaker from the proposition, Ndombet-Assamba, gave examples of non-monetary forms of reparation, based on the 10 point plan for reparatory justice proposed by the Caribbean Community (CARICOM). (Note: The Caribbean Community's ten point plan includes— Full formal apologies, repatriations, psychological rehabilitations and technology transfers.) Making his speech after Dattani, Golooba-Mutebi and Ndombet-Assamba, Tharoor was the seventh speaker in the debate. During Ottaway's speech, two students raised a poster with the words: "Who will speak for ME? #RhodesMustFall"; across the room, another two students held a banner, on which was inscribed "Brutality should not be DEBATED". A doorman attempted to remove the protestors, but they were allowed to stay when it was confirmed that they were not violating the Union's rules.

=== Tharoor's speech ===
Tharoor started his speech by arguing that British colonial rule was responsible for the decline of the Indian economy, claiming that the "economic situation of the colonies was actually worsened by the experience of British colonialism". He noted that at the beginning of British rule in India, the Indian share of the global economy was 23%; when India became independent from British rule in 1947, that share had declined to below 4%. Tharoor argued that the economic progress of Britain from the 18th-century onwards was financed by the economic exploitation and deindustrialisation of British India, including the destruction of the Indian weaving industry. Referencing famines in India (which he claimed were "British-induced"), Tharoor focused on the Bengal famine of 1943, arguing that the responsibility for the famine rests solely on then-British Prime Minister Winston Churchill. Arguing that this was part of a larger pattern of British colonialism, Tharoor then stated:

So, all notions that the British were trying to do their colonial enterprise out of enlightened despotism to try and bring the benefits of colonialism and civilisation to the benighted. Even I am sorry – Churchill's conduct in 1943 is simply one example of many that gave light to this myth.

Tharoor then discussed India's participation in the First and Second World Wars. Noting that one-sixth of British Imperial servicemen in the First World War were Indians, Tharoor focused on the significant economic and human costs incurred by Indians through their mandatory participation in the conflicts, which cost India "8 billion pounds". Tharoor argued that India's contributions to the British war effort significantly damaged the Indian economy. He also noted that Britain incurred a war debt of 3 billion pounds, 1.25 billion of which was owed to India and never repaid. Turning his attention to the infrastructure implemented by the British in India, such as railways, Tharoor argued that it was constructed for the purpose of aiding the economic exploitation of the country, rather than out of a genuine desire to help the interests of the Indian public.

Tharoor rebutted arguments by the opposition which mentioned British aid money to India, noting the amount of aid money sent by Britain was equal to the total money spent by the Indian government annually on fertiliser subsidies; this drew applause from the audience. Tharoor pointed out that reparations had been paid by governments in the past, pointing to British reparations to the Māori and similar payments from the Italian, German and Japanese governments. He continued his criticisms of the arguments made by other speakers in the debate, one of which was the argument that colonialism had given "democracy" to India: "It's a bit rich to oppress, enslave, kill, torture, maim people for 200 years and then celebrate the fact that they are democratic at the end of it. We were denied democracy, so we had to snatch it, seize it from you."

Tharoor ended his speech by focusing on the principle of owing reparations, rather than explaining what they would consist of. He argued that the concept of a "moral debt" was more important than financial debt, being a tool of atonement for wrongs committed in the past: "the principle is what matters". He suggested that Britain pay one pound sterling per annum for the next two centuries as a form of symbolic reparations for "200 years of Britain in India". Tharoor spoke for about fifteen minutes, seven more than what was allotted to him. At the end of the debate, the side in favour of the motion won the debate with 185 votes for to 56 against.

== Reception ==
Within a week of the speech being uploaded on YouTube, the video became the fifth most-watched video on Oxford Union's channel. The speech became a trending topic in India, being shared on several social media platforms and reported on in the Indian media. Tharoor also shared the speech on his personal Twitter account. Actor and comedian Paresh Rawal wrote on Twitter that the speech was "simply mind blowing and enlightening". The speech was called "witty" and "passionate", and was credited as gaining the attention of a wider audience through Tharoor's usage of several "rapier barbs". Scholar Alyssa Ayres, who served on the Council on Foreign Relations, reasoned that Tharoor's quantification of the colonial exploitation of India formed the most important part of his argument. British Labour MP Keith Vaz praised the speech, calling for the return of the Kohinoor diamond to India.

The Prime Minister of India, Narendra Modi, at an event in the Parliament House, New Delhi on 23 July 2015, commented on the debate and the response it generated: "Shashiji's remarks have gone viral on YouTube [... this] shows what impression one can leave with effective arguments by saying the right things at the right place. It reflects the expressiveness [...] of an Indian citizen." Journalists noted that instances of cross-party praise from Modi such as this were rare. Modi's comments were also understood by some commentators to be an endorsement of reparations from the British.

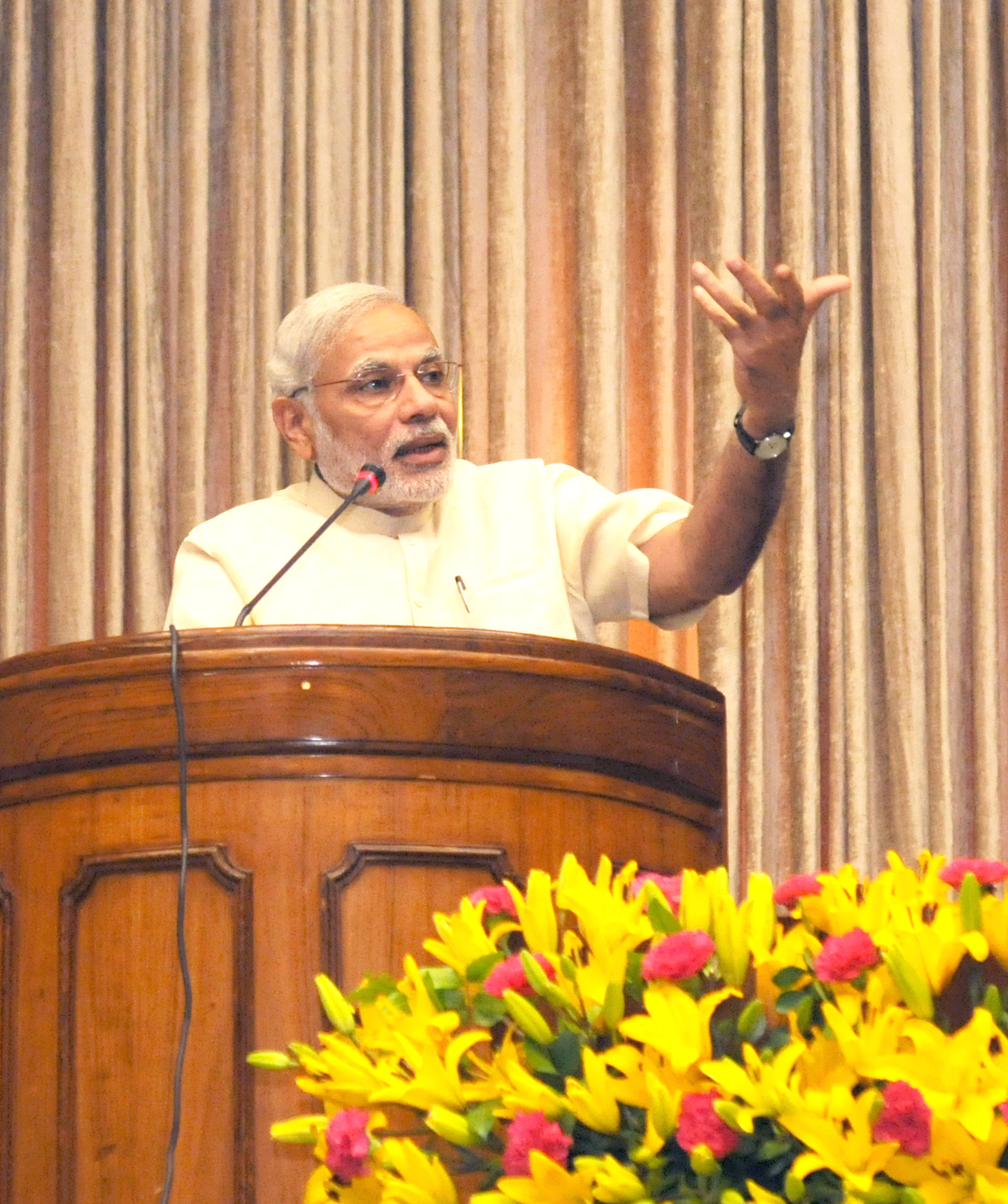
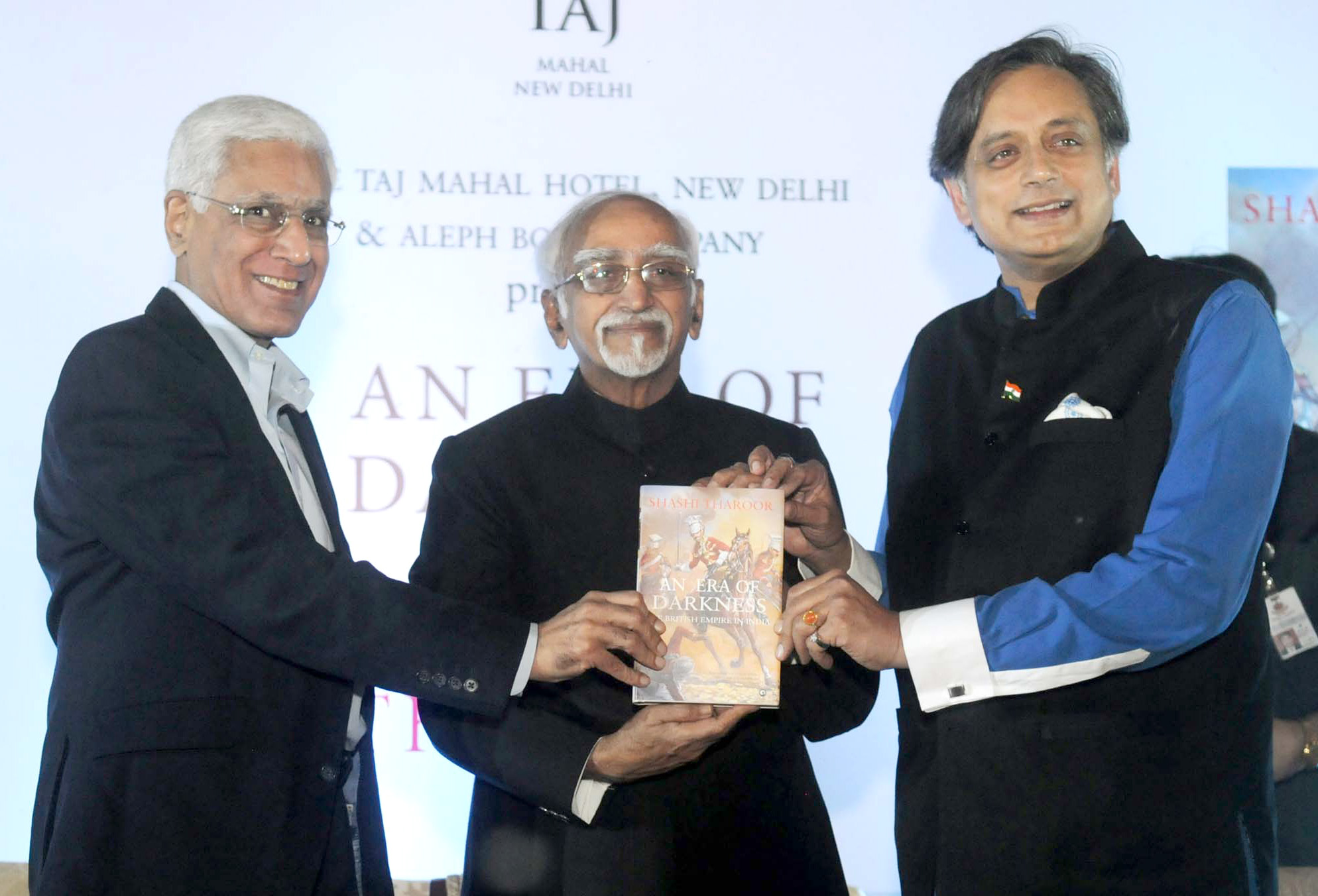
- PM Modi, at Parliament House, during the event in which he commented on Tharoor's speech. Tharoor was present in the audience, first row.
- Tharoor (right) at the book launch of An Era of Darkness: The British Empire in India in 2016. Vice President of India, Mohammad Hamid Ansari (center) and journalist Karan Thapar (left).

Following the debate, Tharoor wrote the non-fiction work An Era of Darkness: The British Empire in India, which was published in 2017 in the United Kingdom and United States as Inglorious Empire: What the British Did to India. Tharoor won the Ramnath Goenka Excellence in Journalism Award in 2017 for the book, as well as a Sahitya Akademi Award in 2019. In the interview with Elle, Tharoor noted that, following his speech at the Union, instances of trolling against him from the Indian right-wing became significantly reduced.

=== Criticism ===
The speech was criticised for several reasons, including accusations that Tharoor oversimplified the economic effect of British rule in India. John MacKenzie, the last speaker in the debate, later wrote that though many of Tharoor's arguments were correct, others were based in falsehoods; noting that India has had a history of imperial formations preceding the British, where the people were exploited for the benefit of the rulers in every case, MacKenzie also argued that economic power in the world shifted over the course of British rule in India and Britain was only partially responsible for the Indian economic decline. Addressing the issue of possible atonement, MacKenzie claimed that "Historians have been offering atonement through their writings for years" and argued that neocolonialism was a far more pressing issue.

The writer Jonathan Foreman, apart from finding the speech "funny", opined that for "a nation as powerful as modern India to revel in victimhood" was demeaning, particularly when it was to only ask for reparation from "'one' of its conquerors". Foreman, while criticising the arguments made by Tharoor, highlighted that the speech was delivered at a debate, and that Tharoor's "performance" was "witty, perfectly timed, elegantly delivered... in exactly the way that Oxford (and Cambridge) Union speeches are supposed to be". Politico's contributing editor Tunku Varadarajan commented on Tharoor's Received Pronunciation accent; Foreman noted this too, writing that Tharoor "epitomizes in many ways, good and bad, the English-speaking, political, cultural and social elite that hastened the end of the Raj, assumed power in New Delhi in 1947, and then through the Congress Party misruled India for more than six decades, all the time becoming increasingly arrogant and corrupt, and seeming almost as insulated from ordinary Indians as their British predecessors had been".

William Dalrymple, a historian, commented that the debate was "the first time I've ever heard the word reparations used" in discussions about the two countries, but pointed out that it was not an official government speech. Dalrymple said that reparations are not the answer, instead urging a revised British educational system that critically engages with Britain's colonial history.

== See also ==
- Barnett formula
- A Question of Europe
