= Dais =

Raised platform

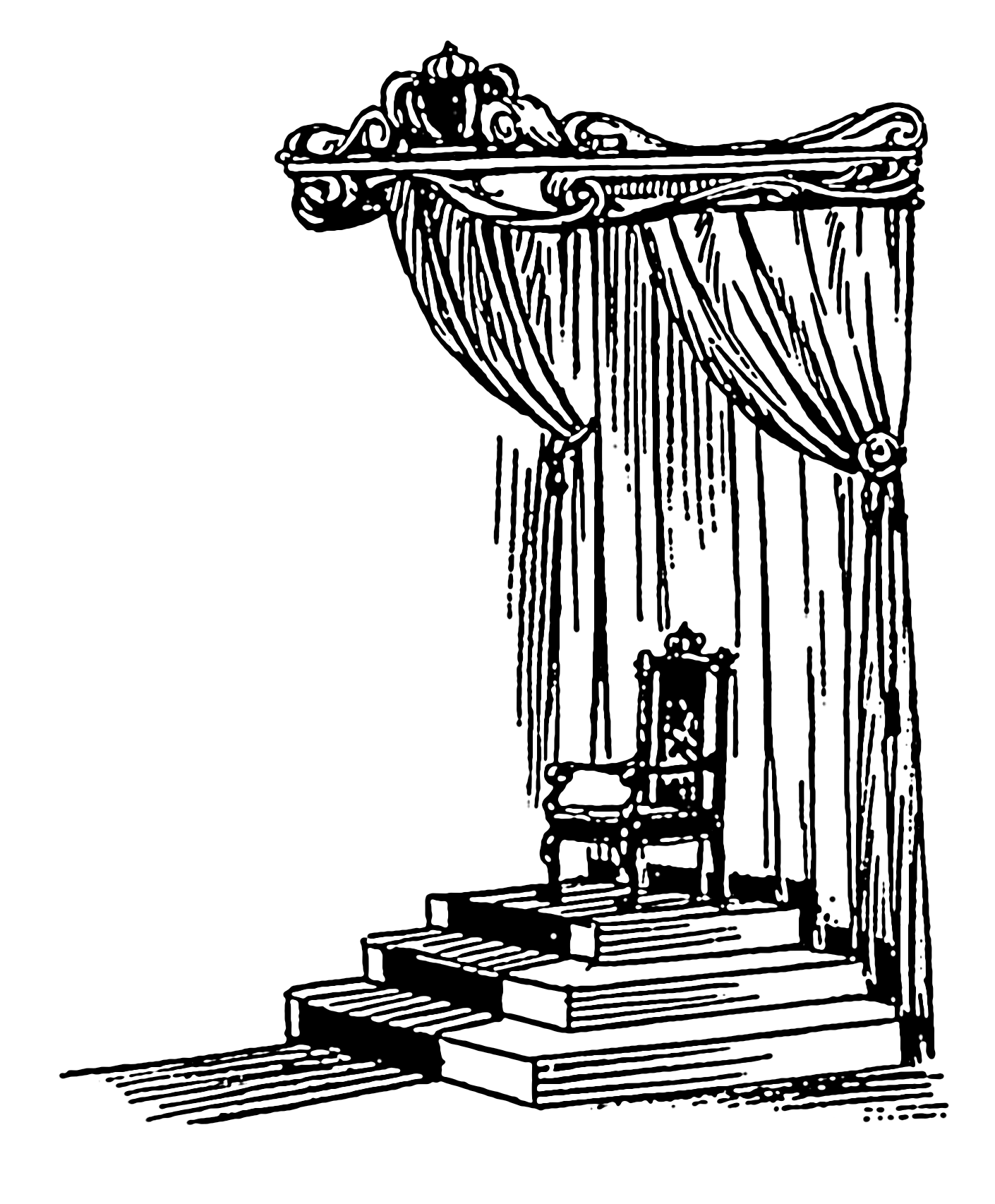
A drawing of a dais with throne under a baldachin

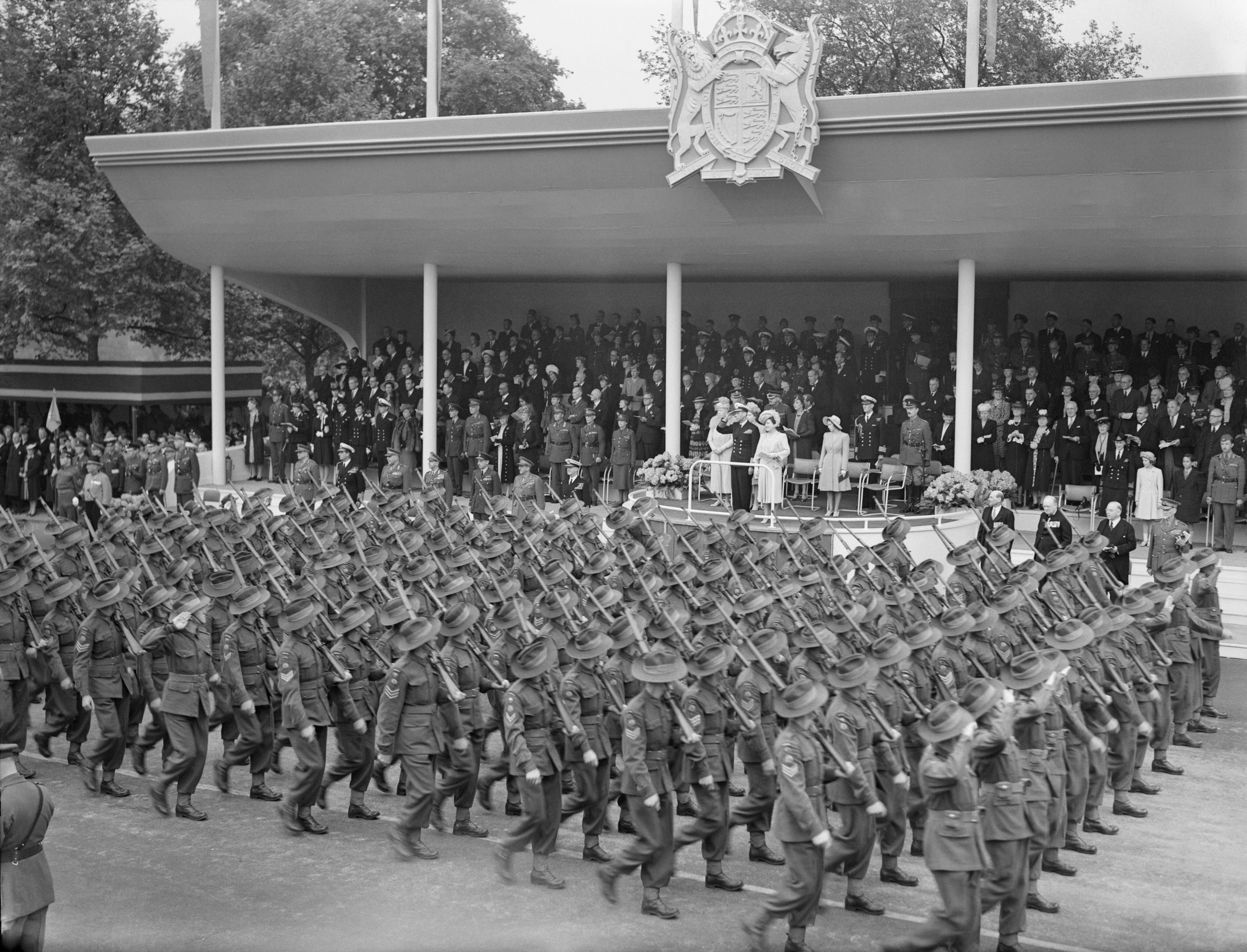
King George VI standing on a dais while reviewing a parade in 1946

A dais or daïs (/ˈdeɪ.əs/ or /ˈdeɪs/, US also /ˈdaɪ.əs/ but sometimes considered nonstandard) is a raised platform at the front of a room or hall, usually for one or more speakers or honored guests.

Historically, the dais was a part of the floor at the end of a medieval hall, raised a step above the rest of the room. On this, the master of the household or assembly (e.g. the lord of the manor) dined with his senior associates and friends at the high table, while the other guests occupied the lower area of the room. In medieval halls, there was generally a deeply recessed bay window at one or both ends of the dais, which provided retirement or greater privacy than the open hall. The dais area often had its own doorway for admission from the master's chambers, whereas most of the guests entered through a doorway leading into the main area of the hall.

At military parades, the dais is the raised, sometimes covered, platform from where the troops are reviewed, addresses are made, and salutes are taken. It can also have stairs and a throne.

In life drawing rooms of art schools, the platform where the model poses for the students is sometimes referred to as the dais.

A dais for giving speeches is called a rostrum.

== Etymology ==
The first written record of the word dais in English is from the thirteenth century. It stopped being used in English around 1600 but was revived by antiquarians in the early 19th century with the disyllabic pronunciation. It comes from the Anglo-French deis, meaning "table" or "platform", which comes from Medieval Latin discus, meaning "table", earlier "disc" or "dish".

== See also ==
- Podium
- Pulpit
- Lectern
