= Joshua Reed Giddings Law Office =

- Giddings, Joshua Reed, Law Office
- U.S. National Register of Historic Places
- U.S. National Historic Landmark
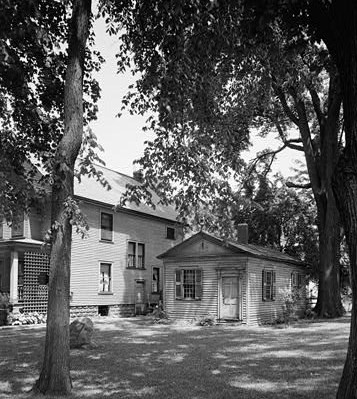
- 1936 HABS photo, showing location on Chestnut Street.

- Location within Ohio Location within the United States
- Location: 102 E. Jefferson St, Jefferson, Ohio
- Coordinates: 41°44′18″N 80°45′47″W
- Area: less than one acre
- Built: 1823
- NRHP reference No.: 74001396

Significant dates
- Added to NRHP: May 30, 1974
- Designated NHL: May 30, 1974

The Joshua Reed Giddings Law Office is a historic commercial building at 102 East Jefferson Street in Jefferson, Ohio. Built in 1823, it was the law office of Joshua Reed Giddings (1795-1864), a prominent abolitionist who served as a U.S. representative from 1838 to 1859. The building was recognized as a National Historic Landmark for Giddings' role in the slavery debates preceding the American Civil War. It is now owned by the local historical society, and is a museum open by appointment.

== Description and history ==
The Joshua Read Giddings Law Office is located east of downtown Jefferson, on the south side of East Jefferson Street, across from the Jefferson United Methodist Church and next to a small public park called Giddings Park. It is a small single-story wood-frame structure, covered by a gabled roof and finished in wooden clapboards. The front facade has the main entrance on the right and a window on the left; a similar arrangement is on the back as well. The doorway is flanked by slender pilasters and topped by a corniced entablature. The building has simple corner boards, which rise to a narrow entablature; the gable above is fully pedimented. The interior of the building consists of a single chamber.

The building was constructed in 1823. From 1838 to 1859 it served as the law office of Joshua Reed Giddings. Giddings was a vocal abolitionist, who pressed debates on slavery during his service in the United States House of Representatives. His radical pronouncements earned him the censure of Congress for violating the body's gag rule forbidding discussion of slavery. Giddings is believed to a significant effect on the antislavery stance of President Abraham Lincoln.

The building is now a museum owned and operated by the Ashtabula County Historical Society. Originally located next to Giddings' house on North Chestnut Street, it was moved to its present location in 2013.

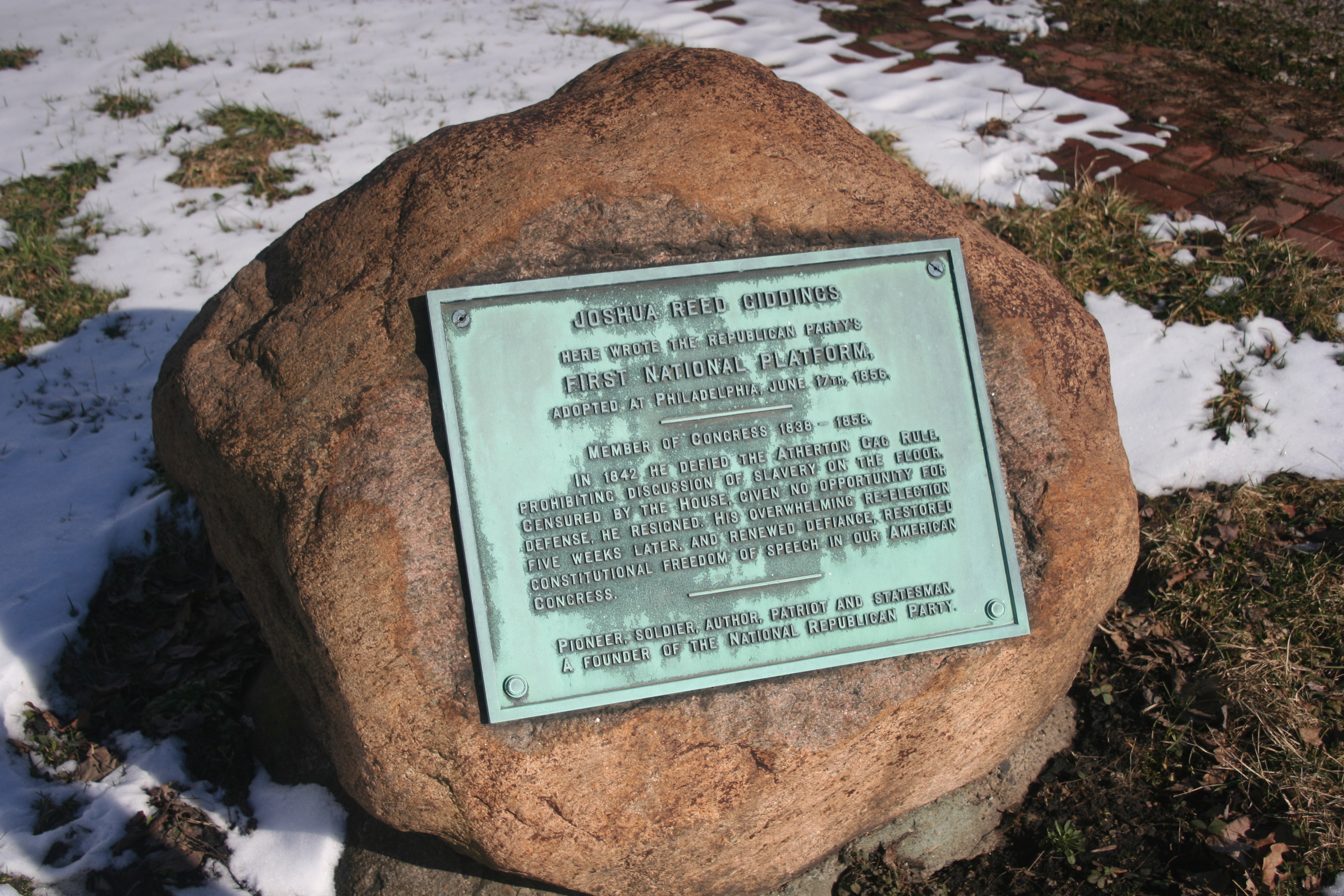
A placard near the law office memorializing Joshua Reed Giddings' public service work

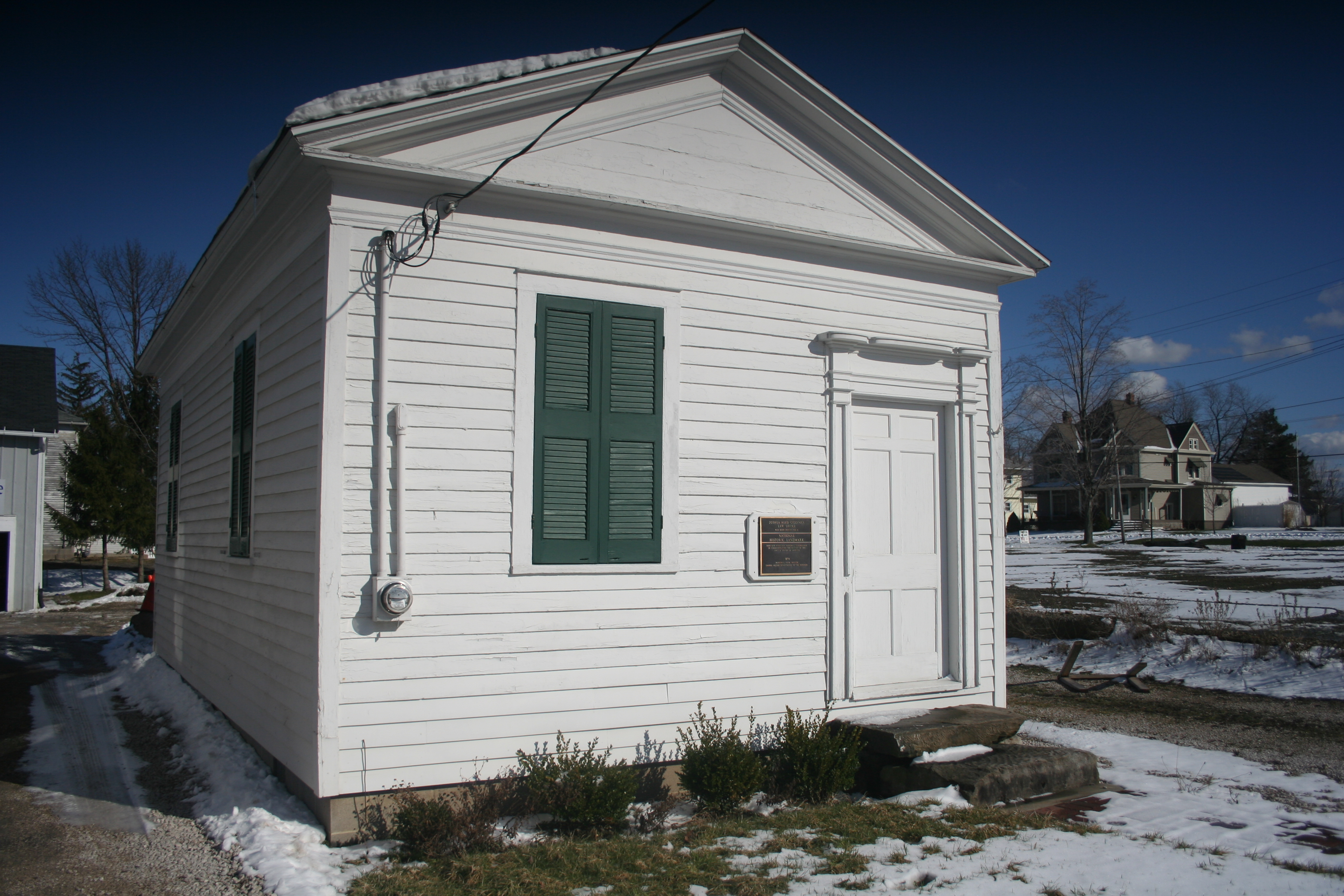
The law office of Joshua Reed Giddings

== See also ==
- List of National Historic Landmarks in Ohio
