= Sadanand Dhume =

Indian-American writer and journalist

- Born: New Delhi, India
- Education: Delhi University (BS); Columbia University (MS); Princeton University (MPA)
- Spouse: Alyssa Ayres
- Website: Official website

Sadanand Dhume is an Indian-American writer and journalist based in Washington D.C.. In 2007 Dhume was an inaugural Bernard Schwartz Fellow at the Asia Society. In 2011 he was a Lincoln Fellow at the conservative Claremont Institute. He is a senior fellow in Foreign and Defense Policy at the conservative American Enterprise Institute for Public Policy Research.

Dhume is a self-identified atheist.

== Publications ==
- My Friend the Fanatic (New York: Skyhorse Publishing, 2009).
