= Evan A. Feigenbaum =

American political scientist

Deputy Assistant Secretary of State for South and Central Asian Affairs
- In office July 2006 – January 2009
- President: George W. Bush
- Succeeded by: Alyssa Ayres

Personal details
- Education: University of Michigan (BA); Stanford University (MA, PhD)

Evan A. Feigenbaum is an American political scientist currently serving as vice president for studies at the Carnegie Endowment for International Peace. He was the U.S. Deputy Assistant Secretary of State for South and Central Asian Affairs from 2006 to 2009 during the George W. Bush administration.

== Education ==
Feigenbaum holds a B.A. in history from the University of Michigan, and a M.A. and Ph.D. in political science from Stanford University.

== Career ==
Feigenbaum was the 2019-20 James R. Schlesinger Distinguished Professor at the University of Virginia's Miller Center of Public Affairs.

Feigenbaum joined the Eurasia Group in June 2010 as Asia Director. He joined the Carnegie Endowment for International Peace as a nonresident senior associate in July 2012.

== Publications ==
=== Books ===
- China's Techno-Warriors: National Security and Strategic Competition from the Nuclear to the Information Age, Stanford University Press, 2003

=== Articles ===
- What China Has Learned From the Ukraine War, Foreign Affairs, February 14, 2023 (co-authored with Adam Szubin)
- How Taiwan Can Turn Coronavirus Victory Into Economic Success, Foreign Policy, June 1, 2020 (co-authored with Jeremy Smith)
- Understanding China's Economic Challenge and Why It Matters, The Atlantic, February 28, 2012
