= My Friend the Fanatic =

Book by Sadanand Dhume

- Author: Sadanand Dhume
- Language: English
- Genre: Non-fiction
- Publisher: Text Publishing
- Publication date: 2008
- Publication place: Australia
- ISBN: 978-1-921-35140-2

My Friend the Fanatic (published 2008-09) is a travel narrative by the Indian-American author Sadanand Dhume about his exploration of Islamic extremism in Indonesia, the world's most populous Muslim country. Dhume's travel companion is a young Javanese, an Osama bin Laden admirer who edits the country's foremost fundamentalist magazine.

The travels described in the book begin at the site of the 2002 bombing of the Sari Club in Bali and end nearly two years later in Ambon, the scene of a civil war between Muslims and Christians. Some of the famous personalities Dhume encounters include Abu Bakar Bashir, the head of Jemaah Islamiyah, the Southeast Asian branch of Al Qaeda, Inul Daratista, a popular singer and inventor of a risque dance called drilling, and the televangelist A. A. Gym. The places he visits include Bandung, Yogyakarta, South Sulawesi and Balikpapan on the island of Borneo

As a self-described atheist, Dhume views the rise of both Islamic extremist politics and orthodox Islamic practice in Indonesia with concern. He challenges the belief that Indonesia's syncretic form of Islam makes it immune to inroads by Islamic extremism.

My Friend the Fanatic was first published by Text Publishing in Melbourne, Australia in 2008 (ISBN 9781921351402), and will be reprinted by Skyhorse Publishing in New York in 2009 (ISBN 1602396434).

The Australian edition of the book has drawn both praise and criticism. Writing in the Far Eastern Economic Review, Robert W. Hefner of Boston University, a scholar of Indonesian Islam, called it “[a] fine book [that] tells us much about Indonesia and about Islamism, one of the most important political phenomena of our age.” The Asian edition of The Wall Street Journal said that Dhume “Guides the reader deftly through the whirlpool these Islamic extremist currents have created.” The Sydney Morning Herald called My Friend the Fanatic “an eye-opening piece of reportage.” However, The Jakarta Post criticized Dhume for pointing out the ideological affinity between the terrorist group Jemaah Islamiyah and the powerful Islamist political party PKS (Prosperous Justice Party). The reviewer called Dhume's observation “clearly very dangerous and misleading.”
