= June 9 Deng speech =

1989 Speech by Deng Xiaoping

- "This storm was bound to come sooner or later." --Deng Xiaoping
- Simplified Chinese: 在接见首都戒严部队军以上干部时的讲话
- Traditional Chinese: 在接見首都戒嚴部隊軍以上幹部時的講話
- Literal meaning: "Speech Made While Receiving Cadres of the Capitol Martial Law Units at and Above the Army Level"
Transcriptions
Standard Mandarin
- Hanyu Pinyin: Zài jiējiàn shǒudū jièyán bùduì jūn yǐshàng gànbù shí de jiǎnghuà

On June 9, 1989, Deng Xiaoping, chairman of the Central Military Commission of the Chinese Communist Party, delivered what was officially termed his "Speech Made While Receiving Cadres of the Martial Law Units in the Capitol at and Above the Army Level". It was his only public speech on the 1989 Tiananmen Square protests and massacre, following the army's intervention and use of force on the student-led protests on June 4.

Portions of the speech aired on the CCTV program Xinwen Lianbo on that same evening. The speech was delivered to a group of People's Liberation Army generals in Beijing. It set the defiant tone for the Chinese leadership that the army's use of force was fully justified, demonstrated that Deng was still firmly in charge of China, quelled rumors of impending civil war, and signaled that reform and opening up would continue as planned.

== Main points ==
The speech contains three major parts: assessing the nature of the Tiananmen Square protests, evaluating the correctness of Deng's major policies since 1978, and setting the tone for future development.

Deng re-affirmed the Chinese Communist Party (CCP)'s decision to authorize the use of force on June 4. He said that given "the macro-international climate and China's own micro climate," (referring to Eastern Europe and the Soviet Union in the former) some sort of anti-party, anti-communist movement was "inevitable". Deng re-iterated the line put forth by the April 26 Editorial that the movement was out to overthrow China's political system and the CCP, going as far as to call the student movement a "counter-revolutionary rebellion." Deng said that a "rebellious clique" sought to work with hostile foreign forces "to establish a totally Western-dependent bourgeois republic", taking advantage of "ordinary people who are unable to distinguish between right and wrong". He called the crisis "the confrontation between the Four Cardinal Principles and bourgeois liberalization".

Deng praised the role of the People's Liberation Army in taking decisive action against protesters, calling soldiers "sons and brothers of the people", and lamented PLA casualties on June 4. He said in taking the role it did, the army passed a 'serious test'; i.e., loyalty to "the people, the teachings of the party, and the interests of the country." Deng acknowledged that some parts of the CCP leadership did not agree with the course of action, but said that he had faith that in the long run, they will change their minds. Deng went on to ask rhetorically whether the reform and opening up that he had implemented in the 1980s were correct. He asked his audience to "ponder" this question. He stated that the goal of China was to become a moderately developed nation by 2050, and that he believes this is only achievable through the leadership of the CCP and political stability. Essentially this is summed up by his signature epithet "One Center, Two Basic Points": that the central focus of the Chinese state was economic development, but that such development should occur simultaneously through 1) centralized political control (i.e., the Four Cardinal Principles) and 2) aggressive market reforms and openness to the outside world.

Deng asserted that the Tiananmen protests arose out of a failure of the leadership to uphold strongly the control exercised by the CCP as well as ideological flexibility that pandered to Western values. He framed Western-style democracy as a sign of bourgeois liberalism and as an ideology that is not well-suited for China's internal conditions. He called on the leadership to further entrench party orthodoxy among young people, effectively re-introducing restrictions on freedom of speech, the press, and assembly. These freedoms were prominent during the more liberal political environment of the late 1980s. Deng also referenced the United States in the speech. He criticized the United States for interfering in China's internal affairs, and alluded to the United States shooting its own student protesters and therefore having no moral authority to criticize China. This is believed to be a reference to the 1970 Kent State shootings.

== Significance ==
At the time of the Tiananmen Square protests, Deng's only official title was that of the Chairman of the Central Military Commission, serving as the Commander-in-Chief, which means that he held ultimate control of the army. Deng delivered the speech in this capacity, as to not overstep his 'official' titles, but in reality it also gave an impression that he was in firm control and the country was no longer at risk of a civil war or uprising. The speech acted to clarify any doubt in the party line for lower level officials and among the general populace. CCP organizations organized citizens to study the contents of the speech.
