= American Infidelity =

1858 speech by Joshua Giddings

American Infidelity is the name of a speech that was delivered in the United States Congress by Joshua Giddings in February 1858. This speech was one of many congressional speeches intended to arouse passion about the immorality of slavery. It also reflects the rising Republican radical movement of the time, which was at the forefront of the anti-slavery movement. In this speech, Giddings said that religion and slavery are incompatible. He likened slavery to murder, on the grounds that to deny a human freedom is to deny him his life. Giddings consequently alleged that all opponents of the Republican Party were infidels.

William Lloyd Garrison was so supportive of this speech that he wrote an appreciatory letter to Congressman Giddings before reprinting the entire speech in his newspaper, the Liberator.
