= Alyssa Ayres =

American diplomat and academic

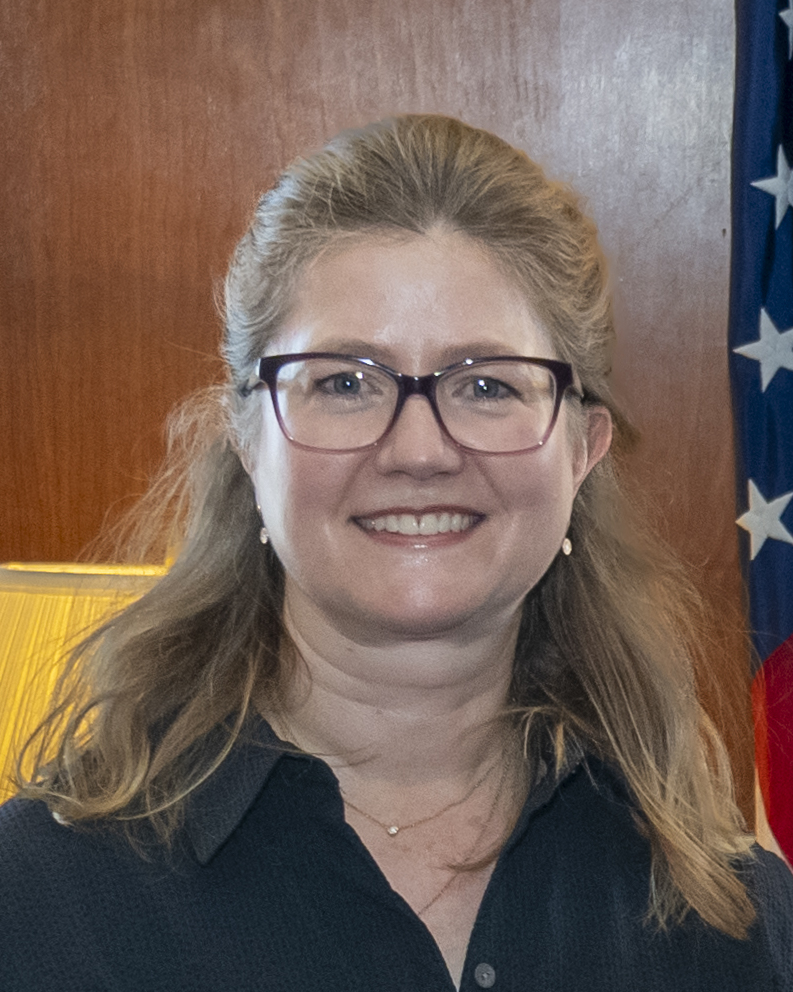
- Ayres in 2023

Dean of the Elliott School of International Affairs
- Incumbent
- Assumed office February 1, 2021
- Preceded by: Reuben Brigety

Deputy Assistant Secretary of State for South and Central Asian Affairs
- In office 2010–2013
- Preceded by: Evan A. Feigenbaum
- Succeeded by: Richard E. Hoagland

Personal details
- Spouse: Sadanand Dhume
- Education: Harvard University (BA); University of Chicago (MA, PhD)

Alyssa Ayres is the Dean of The George Washington University's Elliott School of International Affairs, the first woman to hold the post. She was also a Senior Fellow at the Council on Foreign Relations for India, Pakistan, and Southeast Asia from October 2013 to February 2021. After her appointment as dean of the Elliott School of International Affairs, she has taken a position as an adjunct senior fellow at the Council on Foreign Relations. Her book Our Time Has Come: How India is Making Its Place in the World, was published in January 2018 and appeared on the “Summer 2018: Politics” list in the Financial Times.

== Early life and education ==
Ayres earned a B.A. in Indian studies in 1992 from Harvard College. After that, she studied at the University of Chicago, earning both a master's degree and a Ph.D. in cultural history.

== Career ==
Ayres began her career as an interpreter for the International Committee of the Red Cross in Jammu and Kashmir in the mid-to-late 1990s, before taking a position at the Asia Society as the assistant director of South and Central Asia Policy Programs in 1998. From 2004 to 2007, Ayres was the deputy director of the Center for the Advanced Study of India at the University of Pennsylvania.

In 2008, worked as a founding Director for India and South Asia at McLarty Associates, a Washington, D.C.–based foreign affairs and trade consultancy. In 2010, Ayres was named Deputy Assistant Secretary of State for South and Central Asian Affairs, serving under Assistant Secretary Richard Boucher.

After leaving the State Department in 2013, Ayres joined the Council on Foreign Relations as a Senior Fellow at the Council on Foreign Relations for India, Pakistan, and Southeast Asia, where she was a vocal advocate for strong Indo-American relations.

In February 2021, Ayres was picked as the dean of The George Washington University's Elliott School of International Affairs, following the departure of Ambassador Reuben E. Brigety II. Ayres is the first woman to serve as head of the institution.

Ayres serves on the National Endowment for Democracy's board of directors.

== Publications ==
- Our Time Has Come: How India is Making Its Place in the World (Oxford University Press, 2018) ISBN 9780190494520 OCLC 1011558583
- Working With a Rising India: A Joint Venture for the New Century (Council on Foreign Relations Press; Task force edition, 2015) ISBN 0876096550 OCLC 944185820
- Power Realignments in Asia: China, India, and the United States (SAGE Publications Pvt, 2015) ISBN 9786612425707 OCLC 555881943
- Speaking Like a State: Language and Nationalism in Pakistan (Cambridge University Press, 2009) ISBN 1107404436 OCLC 316002577
- India Briefing: Takeoff at Last? (Routledge, 2005) ISBN 1-315-28973-3 OCLC 959151146
- India Briefing: Quickening the Pace of Change (M.E. Sharpe, 2002) ISBN 9780765608123 OCLC 48884495
