= De-industrialisation of India =

Period of Indian history (1757–1947)

The economic de-industrialisation of India refers to a period of studied reduction in industrial based activities within the Indian economy from 1757 to 1947.

Parts of the Indian economy were controlled under the rule of the British East India Company from 1757 to 1858. This period involved protectionist policies, the restricting, or tariffing, of the sale of British and other foreign manufactured goods within Company territory, and Indian goods and services within Britain. A 10% tariff was imposed on East Indian Company textile imports into England from 1685, and it was doubled to 20% in 1690, with the 1698 Calico Acts restricting the importation of printed Indian textiles, and Scotland from the Duties on East India Goods Act 1707, while the Company had a monopoly on all English, and later British, trade, in either direction, from its 1661 charter revision, to the Charter Act 1813. From 1858 until 1947, much of the Indian economy was controlled directly under British imperial rule, also known as the British Raj.

Amiya Bagchi claimed that the de-industrialisation processes observed in India were a product of colonial rule intentionally aimed at benefiting the British economy. The Industrial Revolution in Europe was dependent on a significant rebalancing of the artisan and manufacturing activities in several European colonies in Asia including India.

== Indian economy between 1600 and 1800 ==
=== Mughal Empire ===
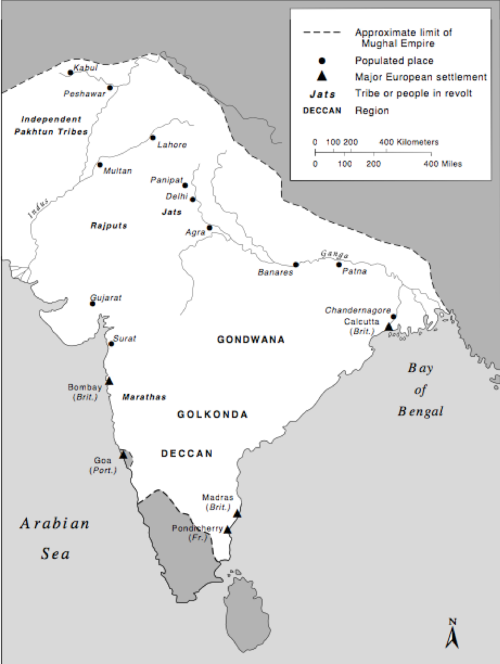
Diagram of the Mughal Empire

The economy of the Mughal Empire is well known for building the Mughal Road system, establishing the rupee as a standardised currency, and the unification of the region. The Empire had one of the largest economies in the world, with an estimated quarter of humanity and approximately one quarter of the economic output, including manufacturing. Mughal India is considered to be one of the richest periods among early modern Islamic cultures.

The production of Mughal India was around 25% of the global industry output in the early phase of 18th century. The wealthiest province of Bengal Subah which generated 50% of the GDP and 12% world GDP was prominent in textile manufacturing; especially the muslin trade. The major exports in the manufacturing industry included steel, shipbuilding and textiles. The major products exported to Europe included indigo, cotton textiles, spices, silks and peppers.

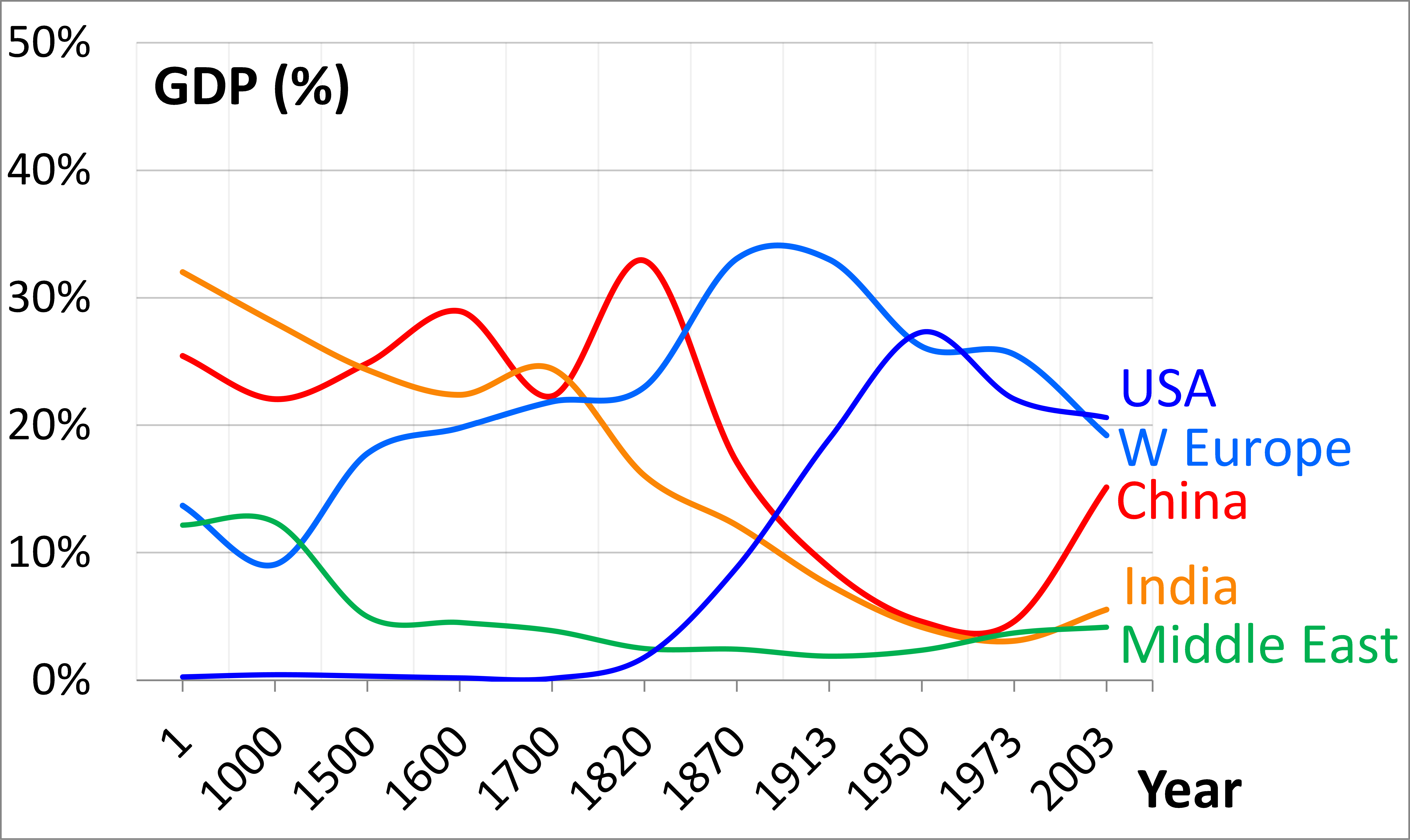
India's global contribution in world GDP

The Mughal Empire was a global leader in the production of luxury products in the form of handicrafts. These luxury goods consisted of cotton, silk, and ivory which had gained a significant market in Europe.

A proportion of these goods were transferred to the European markets, at substantial markups, and were significant in bringing gold, silver and other valuable exchange items into Asia.

The growth of Indian cotton textile imports into Europe created significant competition with local manufacturers, and resulted in the European manufacturers lobbying for import restrictions, and tariffs, on Indian textiles, for example the, 1698, Calico Acts.

=== Maratha Empire ===
The decline of the Mughal Empire led to problems of aggregate supply for Indian manufactured goods. The fragmentation of the Empire resulting in power vacuums that resulted in wars, raiding, looting, tax farming, increased transportation costs, and as a result grain prices, and nominal wages, increasing manufactured goods prices.

A number of the succeeding entities, like the Maratha Empire, would establish new industrial bases across the region, to replicate the Arab and European technologies exhibited by their merchant companies. The Maratha's creating a shipbuilding industry, with Arab and Portuguese assistance, in order to create their own fleet of hybrid ships, like the Grab, and the armaments for a Maratha Navy. As were factories established to hilt Firangi swords, for armies, from imported stock European blades. These industrial centers thrived until their sponsors were defeated, by the East India Company, over a series of wars.

The GDP per capita of India, as a percent of the British level, declined during the seventeenth and eighteenth century period from over 60% of the British level to 15% by 1871. The period from 1600 to 1871 saw an annual population growth rate of 0.22%. In comparison to other nations, industry and commerce grew rapidly during the same phase, driven by exports to Europe.

This led to the steady reduction in GDP per capita during this period before stabilizing a bit in the 19th century.

The period from 1780 to 1860 saw a dynamic shift in India's economy from a world leading processed goods exporter to the extraction and export of raw materials to Britain and buyer of manufactured goods from Britain. The leading export of fine cotton silk was shifted to colonially extracted raw materials including opium, indigo and raw cotton.

== Company rule ==
The Company Rule in India refers to areas in the Indian subcontinent which were under the rule of British East Indian Company. The East Indian Company began its rule over the Indian subcontinent following the Battle of Plassey, which ultimately led to the vanquishing of the Bengal Subah and the founding of the Bengal Presidency in 1765, one of the largest subdivisions of British India. After the British East India Company obtained both control of both the Mughal opium monopoly and the revenue collection rights, in Bengal, they temporarily reduced the volume of gold and silver annually imported, from the Atlantic triangular trade, and historically used by the Company in payment for exports from India; Bengali opium being in part substituted for the imported silver used by the Companies merchants in the China trade, reducing the annual capital inflows into the region, and causing a local currency shortage, while the Company redirected populations to grow and manufacturer opium baskets, for the China trade.

Between 1671 and 1813 the East India Company held a monopoly on English, and later British trade with the Indies, the Company being able to control what goods were traded into its territories, as well as exported. In addition, between 1685 and 1774, the English and later British governments imposed tariffs, or prohibited the import of Indian textiles into Britain, through the Calico Acts. The Calico acts being campaigned for, and later demanded repealed, by British textile workers; initially to protect themselves from cheap Bengali imports, and latter repealed, once they had improved their productivity sufficiently, through the invention and use of mechanised combing, spinning, and weaving machines, in the new industrial factory system, to reduce costs substantially below the previously imported Indian handicrafts. Further helped by the import of cheaper, and in part higher quality, long-staple, American cotton bails. Access to the Companies territories, for the new British manufactured textiles, being demanded and seeded in 1813. From the 1813 abolition of the East India Companies monopoly on British trade in the Indies, the Indian handicraft market, that had previously been protected from British, factory manufactured, imports, was exposed to imported manufactured goods, while local Indian producers were heavily taxed. In addition the East India company undertook a program of works, including the construction of new ports, the metalling of roads, including the ancient Grand Trunk Road, the digging of canals, and the establishment of the first railways, to enable, and reduce the cost, and time necessary, to both import and export goods, through the region; in addition to facilitating the movement of the Companies agents, and its Sepoy armies, to maintain control of the Companies possessions. Programmes a number of regional kingdoms replicated, connecting their nations to the EIC network. The new transport network exposed once isolated, largely self sufficient, handicraft dependent communities, to regional, and global competition, converging and reducing goods prices across the region, impacting uncompetitive producers.

Britain's preferential trade policies, the redirection of global supply chains led to significant productivity gains for the country, with the change from local cottage production to factory goods. This resulted in Britain initially gaining control over first the Indian export market and then the domestic market as well. India's post-1810 deindustrialisation followed the pattern seen worldwide as a result of European colonial occupation.

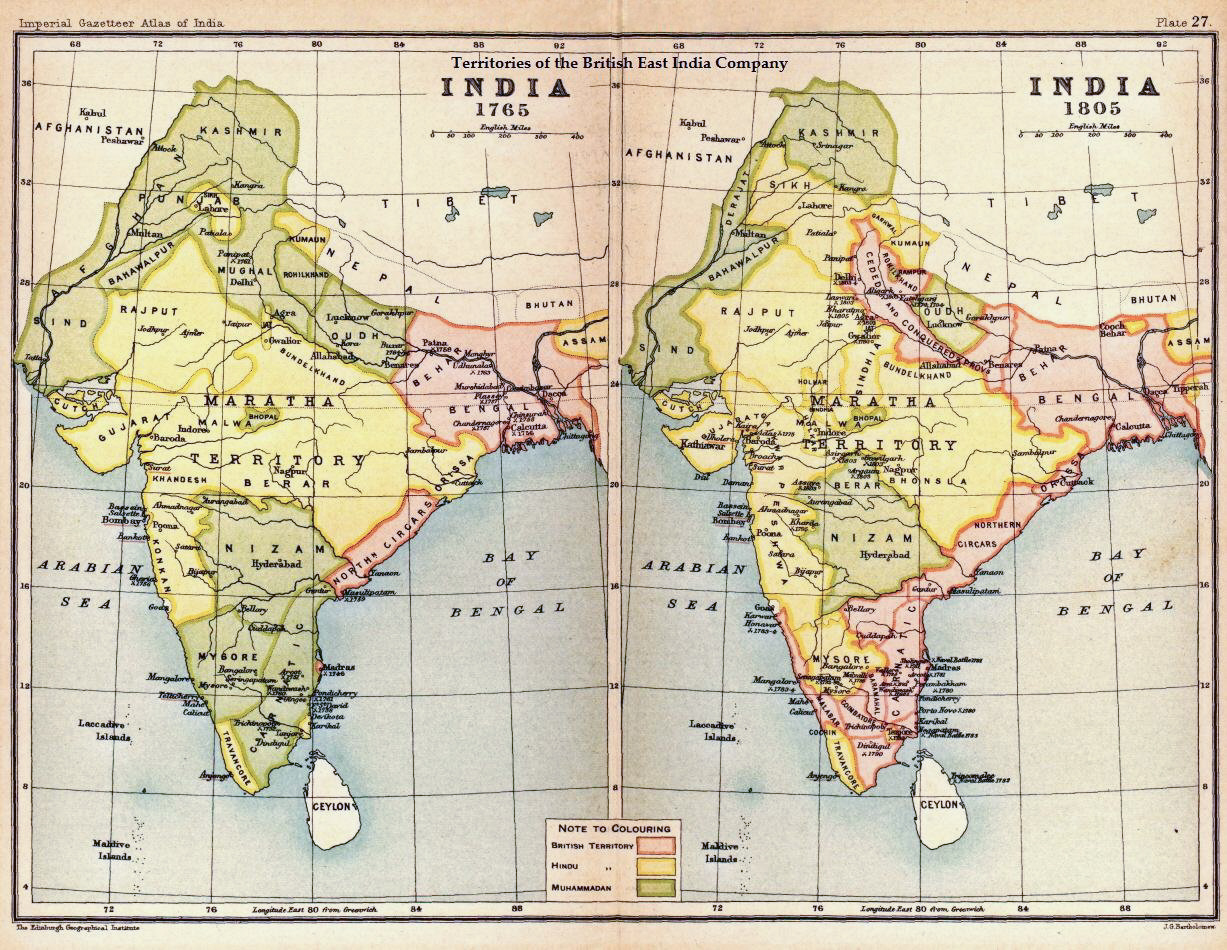
India in 1765 and 1805, showing East India Company Territories in pink

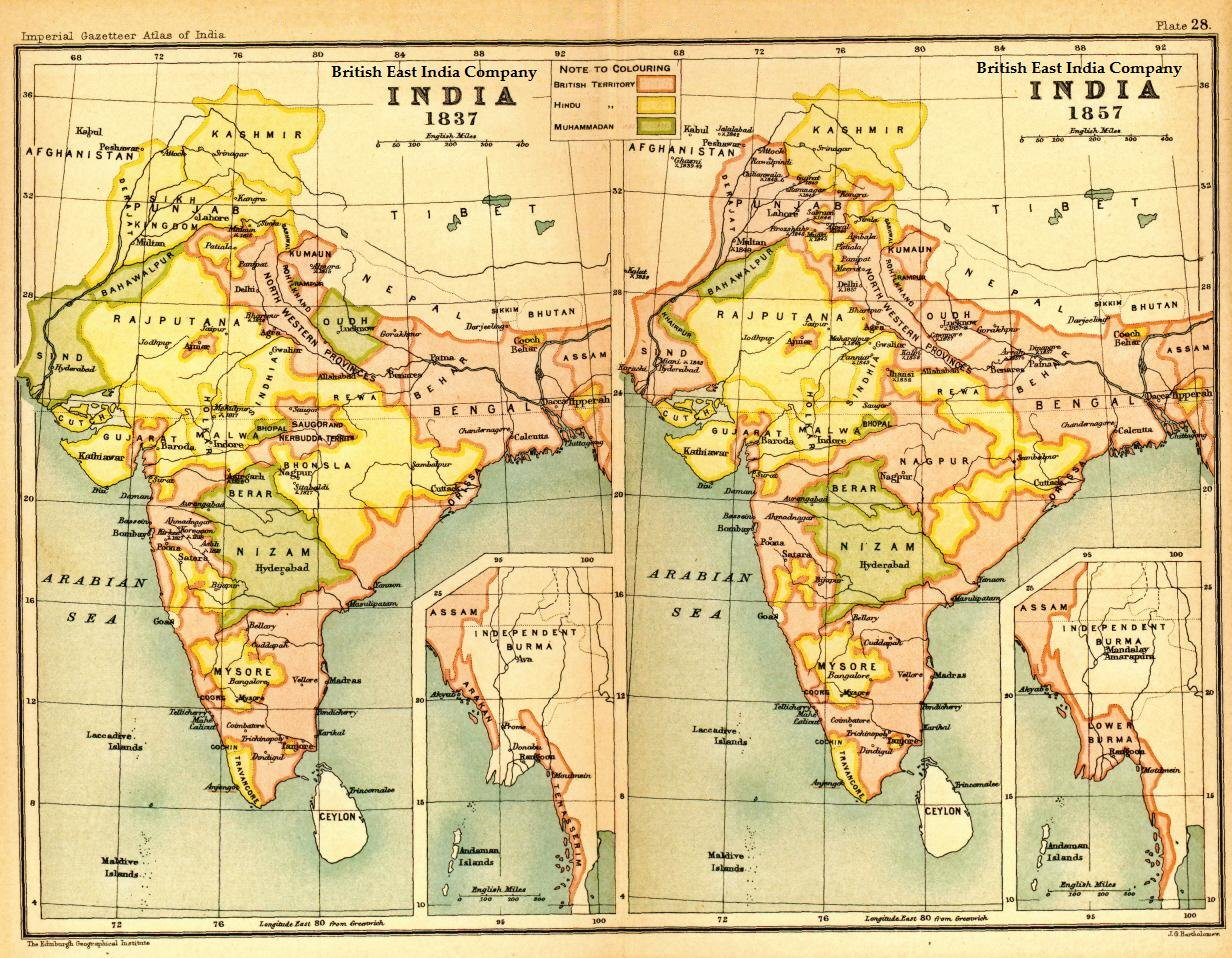
India in 1837 and 1857, showing East India Company-governed territories in pink

== Rule under the British Raj (1858-1947) ==
The rule of the Indian economy under the British Raj refers to the period of the British's direct imperial rule over India from 1858 to 1947, which arose due to the Indian Rebellion of 1857. This marked the formal conquest of India by the British.

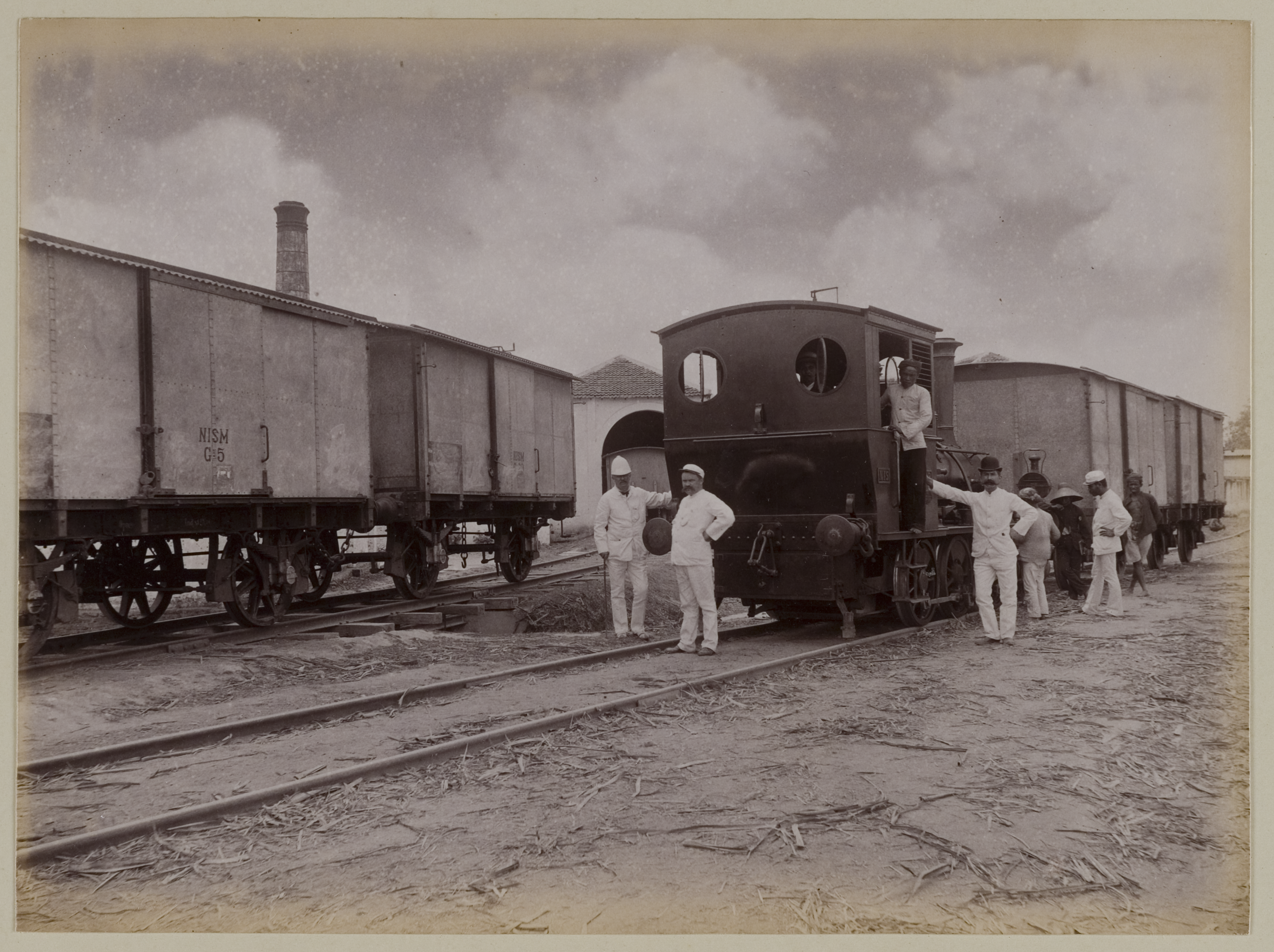
An early railway tram used to transport sugar during 1898

Several economic policies implemented by the British Raj also caused a severe decrease in Indian handicraft (and handiloom) sectors of the economy, particularly resulting in a large decrease in demand for employees, goods and services. Although the Raj did not provide capital to the British economy, due to Britain's declining position in the steel making industry in comparison to the US and Germany, the Raj had steel mills set up in India. The Tata Iron and Steel Company (TISCO) first operated in Bihar in 1908 and later became the largest and leading steel producer in India in 1945.

Large amounts of investments by the private and public British investors contributed to a revamped railway system in India, mainly being used for economic growth and military use. This led to the creation of the fourth largest railway system in the world. At first however, the initial use of the railway system was by private British companies. In 1837, the first train used on the railway system for freight transport ran from Red Hills to Chintadripet bridge in Madras. In 1853, the railway began to be used for passenger travel services from Bombay to Thane, eventually expanding throughout most of the Indian subcontinent. During the First World War, the trains were used to transport troops and grain to other countries such as Britain and South Africa, although by the end of the war, the railway system was largely deteriorated.

During the Great Depression, the Indian economy was not significantly impacted and the government was mainly focused on the shipping of gold to Britain. The most significant economic impact on the Indian economy was deflation, which directly impacted the debt of villagers, and overseas trading of jute in Bengal, a key trading element through the 1920s which had significantly decline during the early 1930s. Furthermore, declining prices of jute and other food crops severely impacted large scale farmers in India. In contrast, sugar became a largely traded crop and a successful industry in the early 1930s.

The colonial infrastructure created by the British government, including legal systems, railways and telegraphs were mobilized towards resource exploitation, leaving industrial growth static and agriculture unable to keep up with natural population growth. The industry output from India relatively declined to 2% of the world's output in 1900. Britain then replaced India as the largest textile manufacturer in the world.

== Cause of de-industrialisation in India ==
In the period between 1775 and 1800, significant innovations occurred in the English textile industry, which increased their total output and the cost of the production declined. This created significant challenges for cotton producers in India where prices were rising. During the same time period, the influence of the British empire increased in the eastern hemisphere as did their control over the Indian subcontinent. British colonial rulers of India considered the need for increasing the market for British produced cotton textiles and thread. British cotton was often produced in surplus quantity by using sophisticated machinery and was exported to the British colonies where it faced competition from indigenous cotton producers. The prices of the British cotton industry were reduced to significantly increase its dominance in India, and heavy taxes were imposed on local producers. This led to a decline in the indigenous cotton industry of the colonies and the domestic activities associated with the production of Indian cotton fell. The fall of the Indian cotton industry is one of the important factors behind the decline of Indian GDP under British rule. In 1600, the per capita GDP in India was over 60% of the level in England, but by 1871 it had fallen to less than 15%.

The fall in the hegemony of Mughals reduced the overall productivity of agriculture and reduced the supply of grains. The grain was the primary consumption good for the Indian workers and was non-tradeable. The reduction in the supply of grain resulted in the rise of its prices. This rise in prices and negative supply shock led to a rise in the nominal wages in the cotton and weaving industry. The increased competition from British cotton and rising nominal wages reduced the profitability of the cotton industry of India. Thus, the negative supply shock in agricultural production is also an important reason behind the de-industrialisation of cotton industries.

The short run as well as long run impact on living standards and growth rate of GDP providing agriculture sector competitive advantage with strengthening of the productivity advance on the land at home or increasing openness to world in turn increases GDP in the short run. The causes of de-industrialisation are region or country specific as in the case of India in the 19th and 20th century. The colonial rule under the British led to the decline of textile and handicrafts industries through their policies and introduction of machine made goods in to the Indian market. Some of the causes of de-industrialisation in India during that period were:

- Introduction of machine made goods in the Indian subcontinent at a cheaper rate, which led to the decline of the traditional textile industry of India.
- Tariff policy opted by the British led to the decline of the handicraft industry, the British government started using preferential trade policies under which British goods were entering in India duty free or no nominal duty payment while Indian exporters had to pay high duty to export goods to British Mainland. Local producers were also subject to a tax (3-10%) to put them on equal footing with British imports that were subject to a tax of the same magnitude.
- Internal Causes, as there were no efforts made to explore products for the Indian markets, the international trade market was in the control of international traders, the manually skilled laborers and traders associated with it were at the pity of the international trade merchants as far as supply or demand propagation in international trade markets was concerned. The guilds or craftsmen organization was also definitely very weak in India as compared to other nations.
- Changes in social conditions that resulted in consistent decline in manufacturing employment that requires access to raw materials and natural resources.
- British rule establishment also resulted in the loss of powers of the craftsmen organization and other bodies that used to supervise and regulate the trade, which results in the fall down of raw materials as well as the skilled laborers which further results in the decline of market value of the products.
- The abolition of court culture and urban aristocrats resulted in decreased demand for these handicrafts as product demand for these dried up.

== Impact of de-industrialisation in India ==
The effect of de-industrialisation on the Indian subcontinent is difficult to observe before 1810. The factory driven technologies for the production of cotton appeared between 1780 and 1820, but, India started to lose its dominant position as the exporter of cotton before this period due to low wages in the Indian cotton industry. It also acted as a catalyst in migrating work force from cotton industry to Indian grain industry. The production capacity of the Indian cotton industry started to decline due to the prevailing wage rate. Furthermore, Indian de-industrialisation is also hard to track due to its relatively low share of textile exports in the total textile production.

In India, by 1920, the trade to GDP ratio declined and international trade reshaped the domestic structure of the economy. India became one of the major markets for the British made cotton yarns and cloths and became one of the large suppliers of grain. The price of cotton decreased by more than a third in the 1900s as compared to the level in 1800. The fall in prices of cotton significantly reduced the production of Indian hand spinning industry which is considered to be the most important specimen of de-industrialisation in India. The industrial revolution of the British cotton industry resulted in the globalization of its colonies as a mean to export excess production. This resulted in the fall the production of cotton in the indigenous industries of colonies due to low prices of British cotton and its derived products.

The large scale de-industrialisation brought far reaching impacts on the economy with loss to traditional economy, which was earlier considered as a blend of agriculture and handicrafts. Spinning and weaving functioned as subsidiary industries in the old economy resulted in differences to the interior equilibrium of the rural market. As an outcome, this led to manually skilled labourers shifting back to agricultural productivity and such overcrowding decreased the efficiency of agriculture sector as well. Land holding fragmentation, excessive cultivation and low-grade and infertile land utilization are the straight impacts of the same. It created a large base of underemployed and disguised rural unemployed. The number of workers engaged in agriculture sector increased from 7.17 crores to 10.02 crores in 1931 and industrial employed workers decreased from 2.11 crores to 1.29 crores during the same period.

The de-industrialisation of India played an important role in the underdevelopment and increasing poverty in the country. The British-led globalisation of colonial India led to the significant inflow of British cotton which led to falling in the output of the domestically produced cotton due to low prices. Consequently, the de-industrialisation process increased the unemployment of artisan and employees of indigenous cotton industry of India. The unemployed artisans and employees resorted to agriculture and it also contributed to the regression towards agriculture and resulted in the surplus labour of land. The colonial policies associated with the land and taxation undermined ability of the peasant class to control and command the land. It pushed these peasants to take significant debt from non-cultivating moneylenders who charged significantly high interests and aided in the underdevelopment and poverty.

== Aftermath ==
India became independent from the rule of the British Raj on 15 August 1947.

India had undergone socialist reforms from the 1950s to 1990s. Prior to economic liberalisation, India experienced low rates of annual economic growth known as the "Nehruvian Socialist rate of growth" and low rates of per capita income growth.

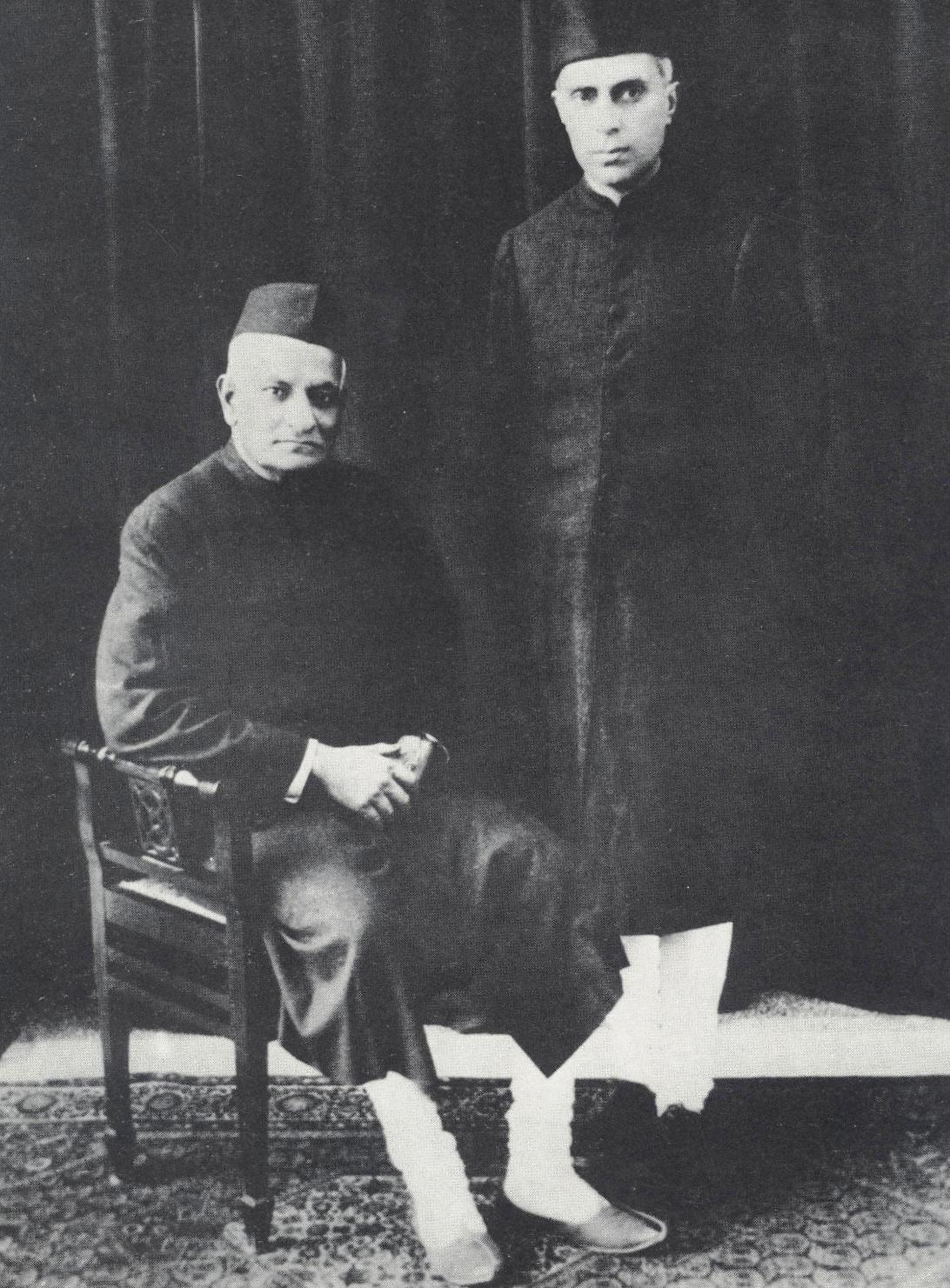
Photo of Jawaharlal Nehru, the first prime minister of India following the end of the British Raj's rule, and his father Motilal Nehru, an activist for Indian independence and a lawyer

Numerous steel plants were set up in the 1950s by Prime Minister Nehru under the belief that India needed to maximise steel production in order for the economy to succeed. This led to the formation of Hindustan Steel Limited (HSL), a government owned company and the establishment of three steel plants throughout the India during the 1950s.

In 1991, the Indian economy underwent economic liberalisation. Through which, India transitioned to a more service and market based sector, with particular emphasis on expanding foreign and private investment within India. Furthermore, in response to deindustrialisation, liberalisation included reductions in import tariffs and taxes, as well as ending many Public Monopolies. Majority of the changes were implemented as a condition for a $500 million loan by the IMF and World Bank to bail out India's government in December 1991.

By the end of the 20th century, India had transitioned towards a free-market economy, through which there was a major decline of state control over India's economy and increased financial liberalisation.

== Economic data ==
Prior to deindustrialisation, the Indian economy accounted for roughly 25% of the global economy. Economic data collected by the OECD shows that growth during the Mughal Empire's reign was more than twice faster than it was around five hundred years prior to the Mughal era. Under the British Raj rule, from 1880 to 1920, the Indian economy's GDP growth rate and population growth rate increased at approximately 1%.

Following deindustrialisation, India's share of the global economy had dropped to approximately 4% in the 1950s.

India's annual growth rate remained approximately around 3.5% prior to economic liberalisation. Per capita income growth had averaged around 1.3% per year.

India's GDP growth rate slowly increased to 7% in the 2018-19 period.

During 2018, India became the fastest emerging economy in the world. India is predicted to return as one of the three largest economies in the world by 2034.

By 2025, it is expected that the Indian working age population will account for at least one quarter of the world economy's working age population.

By 2035, the five largest cities in India are expected to have economies similar in size to middle income economies.

== Conclusion of de-industrialisation in India ==
Amiya Kumar Bagchi considers the economic growth rate to have been insufficient to offset the trajectory of de-industrialisation, stating: "Thus the process of de-industrialisation proved to be a process of pure immoderation for the several million persons..."

== See also ==
- Deindustrialization
