= Open Restitution Africa =

African research project on restitution of African cultural heritage

- Abbreviation: ORA
- Formation: 2020
- Founders: Chao Tayiana Maina; Molemo Moiloa
- Type: Research project
- Website: openrestitution.africa

Open Restitution Africa is an Africa-led research project focused on increasing access to information on restitution efforts for African cultural belongings and human ancestors. The project was founded in 2020 by Kenyan historian and digital heritage specialist Chao Tayiana Maina and South African artist and cultural strategist Molemo Moiloa.

The project developed research resources, case studies, publications, online discussions, and an open-data platform documenting restitution processes involving African cultural heritage, examining how cultural belongings and human remains were claimed, negotiated, returned, or otherwise addressed, with particular attention to African perspectives and experiences.

In August 2026, the founders announced that the project was concluding after six years of activity. They described this as the "sunsetting" of Open Restitution Africa and stated that the project's research, tools, and relationships would continue to inform restitution work beyond the project itself.

== History ==
According to the project's founders, they identified a lack of accessible information about restitution processes involving African cultural heritage. They subsequently established Open Restitution Africa in 2020 to increase access to information and data concerning restitution on the African continent.

The project was initially conceived as a database documenting the return of African cultural belongings. Its scope subsequently expanded to examine how restitution processes take place, including the strategies, negotiations and activities undertaken by African communities, researchers, cultural professionals and institutions.

Open Restitution Africa was developed as a collaboration involving Andani Africa and African Digital Heritage. Code for Science & Society's Incubator describes it as a project that sought to improve access to information about restitution processes involving African material culture and human ancestors.

== Research and activities ==
Open Restitution Africa's activities included research into restitution processes, the production of case studies and reports, public discussions, and the compilation of information concerning African restitution. The project also maintained a directory of people working on restitution and a database of policies and legislation relevant to restitution.

The project's early activities included the Restitution Dialogues, a series of online discussions launched in 2020. The program featured practitioners and researchers from different African countries and addressed questions surrounding the restitution of African cultural heritage.

In 2021, Moiloa discussed the restitution of the Benin Bronzes and the wider restitution debate in an article published by Chatham House's The World Today. She described the Benin Bronzes as one example of a wider and more complex restitution process involving African cultural heritage.

The project also produced the report Reclaiming Restitution, which examined historical African demands for the return of cultural heritage and the role of African narratives in restitution debates.

== Case studies ==
Open Restitution Africa conducted research into restitution processes involving cultural belongings and human ancestors across different African countries and collections outside the continent. The project's researchers worked with practitioners, scholars and other stakeholders to document individual restitution processes.

By March 2025, the project had published 16 case studies covering countries including Botswana, Cameroon, Kenya, Namibia, South Africa, Tanzania, Zambia and Zimbabwe. The project subsequently expanded its case-study collection. In announcing the launch of its open-data platform in 2026, Open Restitution Africa stated that its research had produced 25 restitution case studies covering approximately 200 years and nearly every region of Africa.

The case studies examined different forms of restitution activity, including claims, negotiations, returns and efforts to reconnect communities with cultural belongings and associated knowledge. Examples included research on cultural belongings from Namibia held in Germany, the Tangué of the Bele-Bele Kingdom in Cameroon, and Benin Kingdom cultural belongings held in the Netherlands and elsewhere.

In 2025, Open Restitution Africa began publishing research data and case studies through an open-data platform. The platform was designed to provide a publicly accessible repository of information about restitution processes and to make it possible to explore the project's research through case studies, data visualisations and other resources.

The platform was formally launched in 2026 as a bilingual English- and French-language research and action tool that enabled users to explore restitution cases and related resources.

The platform organised restitution processes as "journeys", a terminology used by the project to emphasise the processes and strategies surrounding restitution rather than solely the movement of individual objects.

In April 2026, Semafor reported on an artificial-intelligence-powered interface developed for the platform. The tool was intended to help users navigate research concerning restitution processes and to bring together information that was otherwise distributed among different sources.

== Publications and research ==
Open Restitution Africa published reports, case studies and other research concerning restitution. Its work was also discussed and published outside the project.

In June 2026, five researchers affiliated with Open Restitution Africa and its partner organisations published the article "Restitution through an Indigenous knowledge systems lens" in the International Journal of Cultural Property. The article examined restitution through Indigenous knowledge systems and drew on case studies from Cameroon and Namibia.

The project also collaborated with researchers and cultural heritage organisations in documenting restitution processes and developing resources intended for researchers, practitioners and other stakeholders.

Open Restitution Africa's research placed emphasis on information generated by African researchers, practitioners and communities. The project's founders argued that existing accounts of restitution frequently focused on European museums and governments, while African demands and activities were less visible in international reporting.

This approach was also reflected in the project's case-study methodology. The 2026 article in the International Journal of Cultural Property described Open Restitution Africa as an "advocacy, open data, and research initiative" and stated that its objective was to address the scarcity of accessible information concerning the restitution of African cultural heritage and human ancestors.

On 25 August 2026, Maina and Moiloa announced that Open Restitution Africa was concluding its work after six years. The founders referred to the conclusion as the project's "sunsetting". They stated that the project had developed research, tools and relationships that they hoped would continue to support work on restitution after its conclusion.

At the time of the announcement, the project's website and open-data resources remained publicly accessible.
