= Dan David (businessman) =

Romanian-Israeli businessman

- דן דוד
- Born: 23 May 1929; Bucharest, Romania
- Died: 6 September 2011 (aged 82); London, England
- Other names: Businessperson, philanthropist
- Known for: Dan David Foundation and Prize

Dan David (Hebrew: דן דוד; 23 May 1929 – 6 September 2011) was a Romanian-born Israeli businessman and philanthropist.

== Biography ==
Dan David was born to a Jewish family in Bucharest, Romania. He joined a Zionist youth movement at the age of 16. After studying economics at university, he worked for Romanian television and became a press photographer. In 1958, his newspaper asked him to travel to West Germany on an assignment. When he requested an exit permit, he was accused of being a Zionist activist and was fired from his job.

He left Romania for Paris in August 1960, later settling in Israel. The following year, he traveled to Europe.

David died in London on 6 September 2011.

== Business career ==
With a $200,000 loan from a cousin, he won the franchise for Photo-Me International automated photography booths in certain countries. He opened branches in Israel, Spain, Romania and Italy, eventually taking over the company. When David was chairman of Photo-Me in 1999, his and board-member Serge Crasnianski's shares were valued at 210 and 200 million pounds, respectively.

== Dan David Prize ==
In 2000, David founded the Dan David Foundation with a $100 million endowment. The Foundation awards the Dan David Prize (first awarded in 2002), which is headquartered at Tel Aviv University. For its first 20 years, the prize consisted of three $1 million awards granted in rotating fields of the sciences and the humanities. In 2021, the Foundation announced it was redesigning the prize to focus on history and other disciplines that study the past, granting up to nine awards of $300,000 to early- and mid-career researchers in those fields.

== Commemoration ==
The Dan David Center for Human Evolution and Biohistory Research was inaugurated on 25 November 2018, in Dan David's memory. The Center is affiliated with both the Sackler Faculty of Medicine and the Steinhardt Museum of Natural History, where its laboratories and facilities encompass over 1200 meters squared. The facilities include a micro-CT as well as histological and ancient DNA laboratories. The Center also houses Israel's national fossil collection, and a museum exhibit on human biological and cultural evolution.
