= Shubhra Gupta =

Indian film critic

- Occupation: Film critic
- Notable work: 50 Films That Changed Bollywood, 1995–2015
- Awards: Ramnath Goenka Award

Shubhra Gupta is an Indian film critic who writes for The Indian Express. She received the Ramnath Goenka Award for Best Writing on Cinema in 2012. She was a member of the Central Board of Film Certification from 2012 to 2015. She is the author of 50 Films That Changed Bollywood, 1995–2015.

== Career ==
Gupta began reviewing films in addition to her work as a journalist in the early 1990s. After more than twenty years as a film critic, she wrote the book 50 Films That Changed Bollywood, 1995–2015 about the development of the film industry in India.

In 2011, she was appointed to the Central Board of Film Certification for a three-year term.

In June 2023, Pan Macmillan India published her second book IRRFAN: A Life in Movies, a comprehensive tribute to actor Irrfan Khan.

She curates and conducts The Indian Express Film Club, in Delhi and Mumbai. The screening is followed by animated discussion, which she moderates. She is a frequent traveller to film festivals in Europe and has served on national and international juries.

== Books ==
- 50 Films That Changed Bollywood, 1995–2015, 9789351778479
- IRRFAN: A Life in Movies, 9788119300853

== Awards ==
- 2012 Ramnath Goenka Award for the Best Writing on Film
