= Rudraneil Sengupta =

Indian journalist, author, and sports writer

- Born: Arakonam Chennai, India
- Education: (M.A.) Jadavpur University
- Occupations: Journalist, author
- Years active: 2000–present
- Known for: Enter the Dangal: Travels through India's Wrestling Landscape
- Awards: Ramnath Goenka Excellence in Sports Journalism Award (2007)

Rudraneil Sengupta is an Indian journalist, author, and former deputy editor of Lounge, the weekly feature magazine of Mint. He is best known for his work in sports journalism and his book Enter the Dangal: Travels through India's Wrestling Landscape. His journalistic work has focused on various social and cultural issues, including gender and human rights. He is a recipient of the Ramnath Goenka Award.

== Early life and education ==
Rudraneil Sengupta was born in India and holds a master's degree in English from Jadavpur University, Kolkata.

== Career ==
Sengupta worked as a sports journalist for TV news channels before joining Mint, a leading Indian business newspaper, in 2010. At Mint, he became the deputy editor of Lounge, the magazine's feature section.

His coverage has frequently examined the intersection of sports and social issues, including the challenges faced by women in traditionally male-dominated sports.

In 2016 Sengupta published his book Enter the Dangal: Travels through India's Wrestling Landscape, which explores the rise of wrestling in India, particularly focusing on the empowerment of women through the sport. His work in this area won him critical acclaim for shedding light on the unique social and cultural impact of wrestling in India.

== Awards ==
Sengupta received the Ramnath Goenka Award for excellence in sports journalism in 2007.

In 2015 he received the Society of Publishers of Asia (SOPA) Awards for excellence in reporting on human rights issues for a story he co-wrote with Dhamini Ratnam on gender testing of female athletes.

== Books ==
- Sengupta, Rudraneil (7 May 2025). The Beast Within. Westland Publications. ISBN 9789360450472.
- Sengupta, Rudraneil (2016). Enter The Dangal (Travels Through India's Wrestling Landscape). Harper Collins Publishers. ISBN 9789350297698.

== Activism ==
He continues to write and engage with issues related to sports and culture, particularly gender and human rights.
