= Dagomar Degroot =

Environmental historian

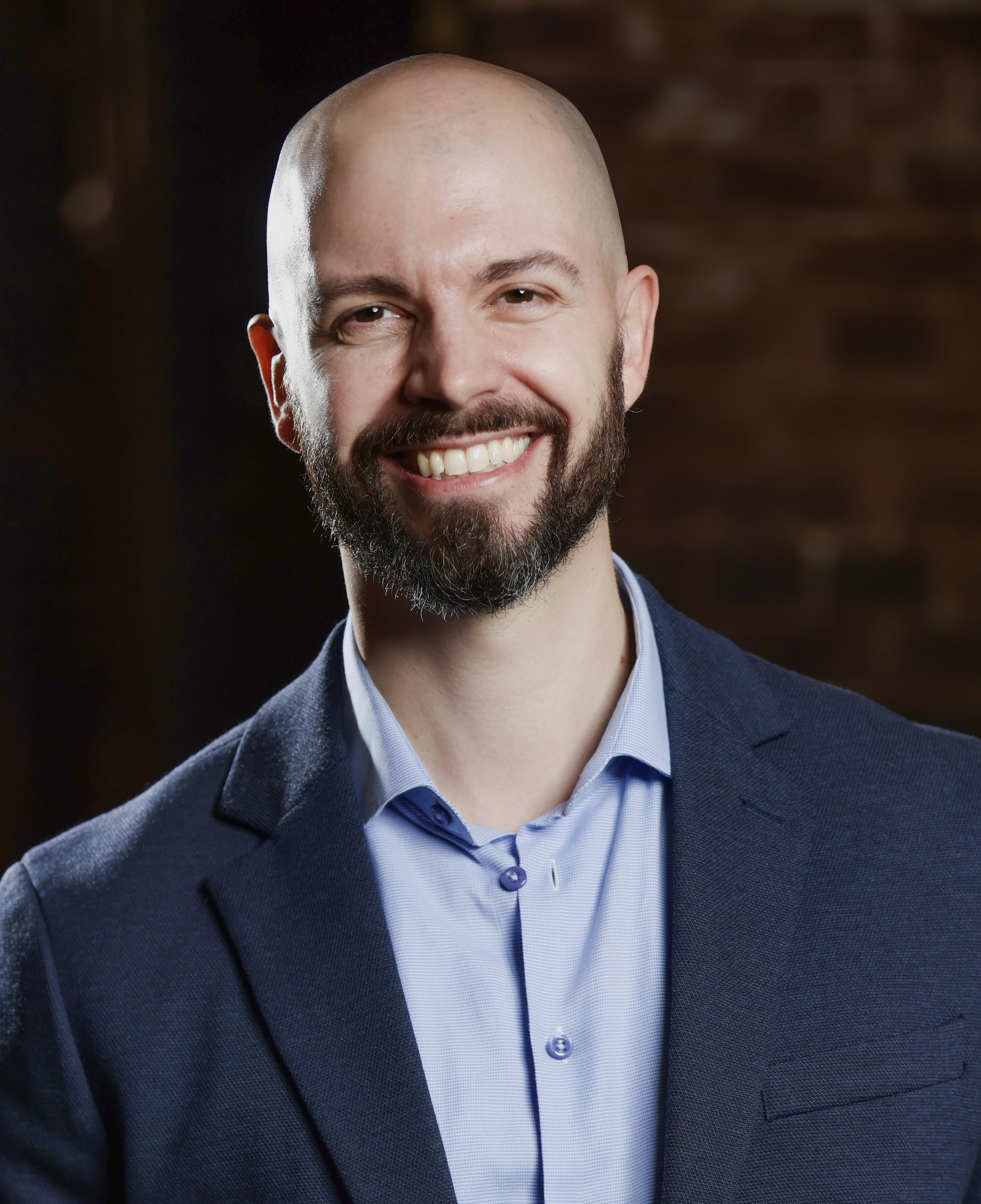
- Born: Raamsdonksveer
- Occupation: Environmental historian
- Employer: Georgetown University
- Known for: Climate history; environmental history of space
- Awards: Dan David Prize
- Website: dagomardegroot.com

Dagomar Degroot (born February 26, 1985) is an environmental historian, author, and professor at Georgetown University. He was the 2024–25 Baruch S. Blumberg Chair in Astrobiology, Exploration, and Scientific Innovation at the Library of Congress. His interdisciplinary scholarship bridges the humanities and natural sciences to examine how past societies – on Earth and beyond – responded to environmental change. He is particularly known for his work on climate history, resilience, and adaptation, and for exploring the environmental history of outer space as a dimension of human–environment interaction. He is a proponent of historical scholarship that engages explicitly with present-day concerns, including global catastrophic risks such as climate change, pandemics, and the continued development of artificial intelligence.

== Life and education ==
Degroot was born in Raamsdonksveer, the Netherlands, in 1985. He emigrated to Canada in 1988, and in 2007 completed a B.A in History and English at McMaster University. After earning an M.A. in history from McMaster in 2008, he received his PhD from York University in 2014. He completed one year of a two-year postdoctoral fellowship at the University of Western Ontario before joining Georgetown University in Washington, DC, as an assistant professor in 2015.

== Research ==
Degroot argues that environmental changes – on Earth and across the Solar System – have had a greater influence on human history than commonly assumed. However, his publications on social responses to climate change in the Arctic, or on relationships between climate change and human conflict, emphasize that the impacts of these changes on people and on local environments have been complex and occasionally counter-intuitive. He has therefore worked to establish methods to identify subtle connections between human and natural histories.

Degroot is among the first historians to write about the successes of societies and communities in coping with past climate change. In 2018, he published a book, The Frigid Golden Age, that argues that the Dutch Republic – precursor state to the present-day Netherlands – was resilient and even adaptive in the face of a period of cold climate known as the Little Ice Age. The book was named by the Financial Times as one of the top ten history books of 2018.

He has since worked with other scholars to establish how other societies survived and even thrived during periods of preindustrial climate change. He has sought to identify strategies used by these societies that can inform today's efforts to adapt to human-caused global warming. He has emphasized that resilience is not always virtuous, since many populations have historically prospered during climate changes by exploiting or plundering other populations.

Degroot has also argued that the Solar System is a mosaic of dynamic environments that influenced, and were influenced by, human history. In 2025, he published a book, Ripples on the Cosmic Ocean, that argues that changes in cosmic environments revealed the existence of global risks, prompted debates about alien life, and shaped the histories of mass media, technology, and culture in previously unknown ways. He has argued that early efforts to prevent microbial contamination of the Earth and other worlds through space travel can be seen as a failure that shows how competitive and poorly regulated government or corporate programs create world-threatening risks.

Beyond conventional academic publishing, Degroot has used digital media to bring environmental history scholarship to broad audiences. He co-founded the Climate History Network, an international organization of approximately 200 scholars who study past climate change, and created The Climate Chronicles, a podcast and multimedia project on the history of climate change. The Climate Chronicles jointly received the European Society for Environmental History’s 2025 Bristol–Bern Prize in Public Environmental History. His other digital projects include Climate Tipping Points, an atlas of tipping-points research, and After2C, an interactive history of possible climate futures, written from 2100.

== Select bibliography ==
=== Books ===
- The Frigid Golden Age: Climate Change, the Little Ice Age, and the Dutch Republic, 1560–1720. New York: Cambridge University Press. 2018. ISBN 978-1-108-41931-4.
- Ripples on the Cosmic Ocean An Environmental History of Our Place in the Solar System. Cambridge, MA: Harvard University Press. 2025. ISBN 978-0-674-98650-3.

=== Journal articles ===
- Degroot, Dagomar (June 2023). "One Small Step for Man, One Giant Leap for Moon Microbes? Interpretations of Risk and the Limits of Quarantine in NASA's Apollo Program". Isis. 114 (2): 272–298. doi:10.1086/724888.
- Degroot, Dagomar (April 2022). "Blood and bone, tears and oil: Climate change, whaling, and conflict in the seventeenth-century Arctic". The American Historical Review. 127 (1): 62–99. doi:10.1093/ahr/rhac009.
- Degroot, Dagomar (October 2022). "The history of climate and society: a review of the influence of climate change on the human past". Environmental Research Letters. 17 (10): 103001. doi:10.1088/1748-9326/ac8faa. hdl:10852/100641.
- Degroot, Dagomar (March 2021). "Towards a rigorous understanding of societal responses to climate change". Nature. 591: 539–550. doi:10.1038/s41586-021-03190-2.
- Degroot, Dagomar (May–June 2018). "Climate Change and Society in the 15th to 18th Centuries". Wiley Interdisciplinary Reviews: Climate Change. 9 (3): e518. Bibcode:2018WIRCC...9E.518D. doi:10.1002/wcc.518.
- Degroot, Dagomar (January 2017). "A Catastrophe Happening in Front of Our Very Eyes: The Environmental History of a Comet Crash on Jupiter". Environmental History. 22 (1): 239–273. doi:10.1093/envhis/emw067.
- Degroot, Dagomar (May 2014). "Never such weather known in these seas': Climatic Fluctuations and the Anglo-Dutch Wars of the Seventeenth Century, 1652-1674". Environment and History. 20 (2): 239–273. doi:10.3197/096734014X13941952681034.

== Awards and recognition ==
In June 2026, Degroot was awarded the Dan David Prize endowed by the Dan David Foundation and Tel Aviv University.
