= Sixteen Stormy Days =

Book on the First Amendment to the Constitution of India

- Author: Tripurdaman Singh
- Language: English
- Genre: Non-fiction; Modern India; Indian Constitution
- Publication date: 1 February 2020
- Publication place: India
- Media type: Hardcover
- Pages: 288
- ISBN: 978-0-670-09287-1
- Website: Penguin India

Sixteen Stormy Days: The Story of the First Amendment to the Constitution of India is the non-fiction book written by historian Tripurdaman Singh and published by Penguin Random House in February 2020. The book is about the first amendment of the constitution of India and its history.

== Publication ==
Sixteen Stormy Days: The Story of the First Amendment to the Constitution of India is the non-fiction book written by historian Tripurdaman Singh and published by Penguin Random House in February 2020. Book has 288 pages.

== Reception ==
The book was well received by critics:

- Zareer Masani, writing for Open, said the book is "concise", "very readable" and "exhaustively researched". Masani wrote that Singh has deftly painted a picture of the "disparate opposition" which the bill faced. He also wrote that author has dismissed the tendency of the historians to blame colonial governments for the emergency power, while in fact, the law of sedition as it stands today was the outcome of the first amendment, a post-independence legislation.
- Somak Ghosal, writing for LiveMint, called Singh's analysis of the events leading to "radical turnout" and "compelling reading".
- Soni Mishra, over the review in The Week, wrote that book "brings out the furore that the amendment gave rise to" and added that it represents the "first battle of Indian liberalism".
- Reviewing for The Sunday Guardian, M.D. Nalapat had said that book would have never been allowed to get distributed in India during the Nehru's rule because of criticism.
- Amrinder Singh, in a review published in The Tribune, called the book as ""expertly researched, concise and readable, unburdened by the legal intricacies of various cases".

The book was listed as the Read of the Week by Deccan Herald from 19 to 26 January 2020. Firstpost also listed it in the Books of the Week on 2 February 2020.
