= Dan David Prize =

Annual history awards

- Awarded for: Outstanding work in the study of the human past
- Country: Israel
- Presented by: Dan David Foundation
- Rewards: US$3,000,000 (Nine US$300,000 prizes and one US$300,000 fellowship)
- First award: 2002; 24 years ago
- Website: dandavidprize.org

The Dan David Prize, founded in 2000 by Dan David, is an international group of awards that recognize and support outstanding contributions to the study of history and other disciplines that shed light on the human past. Nine prizes of $300,000 are awarded each year to outstanding early- and mid-career scholars and practitioners in the historical disciplines. The Prize has an annual purse of $3 million, making it the largest history award in the world, including $300,000 funding an international postdoctoral fellowship program at Tel Aviv University, where the Prize is headquartered. The Prize is endowed by the Dan David Foundation.

Until 2021 the prize consisted of three annual prizes of $1 million for innovative and interdisciplinary research in three time dimensions: Past, Present and Future. Prize laureates donated 10 percent of their prize money to doctoral scholarships for outstanding Ph.D. students and postdoctoral scholarships in their own field from around the world.

In September 2021, the Dan David Prize announced that it would shift its focus to support the work of "historians, art historians, archaeologists, digital humanists, curators, documentary filmmakers and all those who deepen our knowledge and understanding of the past".

== History ==
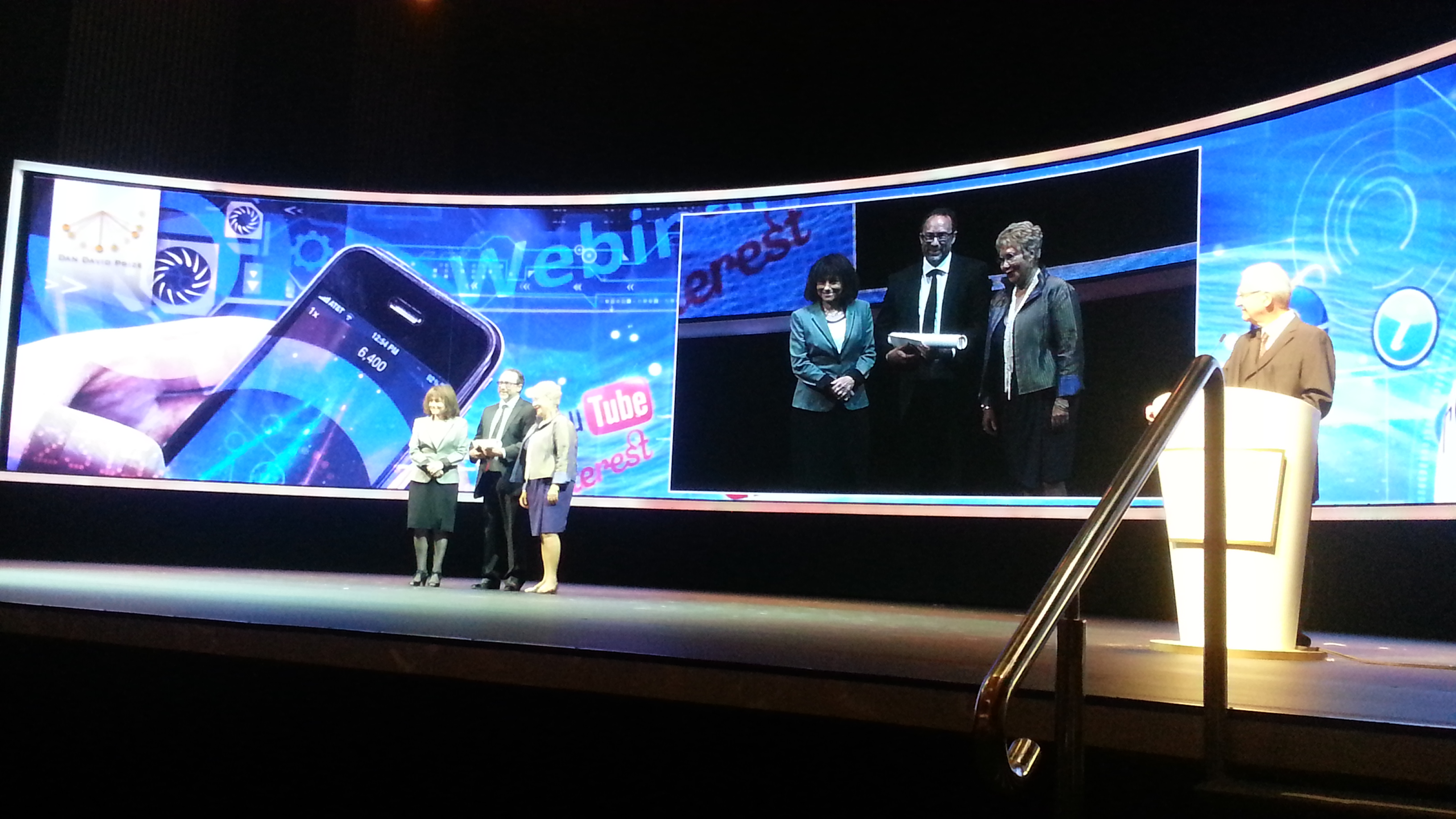
Jimmy Wales accepting the Dan David Prize at Tel Aviv University, 2015

The Dan David Foundation was founded in 2000 with a $100 million endowment by Romanian-born Israeli businessman and philanthropist Dan David. The Dan David Prize was founded with the goal of rewarding and encouraging innovative and interdisciplinary research that cuts across traditional boundaries and paradigms. Each year, three prizes of $1 million were awarded in rotating fields to those who made outstanding contributions to humanity. Its founding director from 1999 until 2002 was Gad Barzilai. Its chairman since 2007 is Itamar Rabinovich.

In anticipation of the prize's 20th anniversary in 2021, the Dan David Prize refocused in a new direction, citing the decline of global investment in the humanities and the relative scarcity of major prizes in the humanities. The redesigned prize focuses on supporting outstanding research in the historical disciplines and celebrating scholars and practitioners whose work illuminates the human past and enriches public debate with a deeper understanding of history.

The Prize announced that starting in 2022 it would award up to nine prizes of $300,000 each year to early- and mid-career scholars and practitioners around the world to recognize significant achievements in the study of the past and support the winners' future endeavours. From 2022, there will no longer be a distinction between three prize categories.

Laureates include cellist Yo-Yo Ma (2006), Israeli author Amos Oz (2008), U.S. Vice President Al Gore (2008), Canadian author Margaret Atwood (2010), French economist Esther Duflo, and immunologist Dr. Anthony Fauci (2021).

The prize has occasionally faced political controversy. In 2016, Catherine Hall of University College London rejected the Dan David Prize based on considerations related to the Israeli–Palestinian conflict. Her prize money was donated to fund scholarships at Tel Aviv University. In 2026, an open letter signed by more than 100 academics urged Australian historian Matthew Champion of Melbourne University to reject the award over the war in Gaza and Israel's regional policies. The intervention drew pushback from university leadership and other scholars who criticized attempts to politicize international academic recognition.

From 2022 recipients of the prize were called winners rather than laureates. The first cohort of prize winners was announced on March 1, 2022.

== Laureates (2002–2021) ==
Year	Theme	Laureate
2002	Past – History	Warburg Library
2002	Present – Technology, Information and Society	Daniel Hillis
2002	Future – Life sciences	Sydney Brenner, John Sulston, Robert Waterston
2003	Past – Paleoanthropology	Michel Brunet
2003	Present – Print and electronic media	James Nachtwey, Frederick Wiseman
2003	Future – cosmology and astronomy	John N. Bahcall
2004	Past – Cities: Historical legacy	Rome, Istanbul, Jerusalem
2004	Present – Leadership: Changing our World	Klaus Schwab
2004	Future – Brain sciences	Robert Wurtz, Amiram Grinvald, William Newsome
2005	Past- Archaeology	Graeme Barker, Israel Finkelstein
2005	Present – The performing arts: film, theater, dance, music	Peter Brook
2005	Future – Materials science	Robert S. Langer, George M. Whitesides, C. N. R. Rao
2006	Past – Music	Yo-Yo Ma
2006	Present – Journalism	Magdi Allam, Monica Gonzalez, Adam Michnik, Goenawan Mohamad
2006	Future – Treatment of cancer	John Mendelsohn, Joseph Schlessinger
2007	Past – Historians	Jacques Le Goff
2007	Present – Contemporary music	Pascal Dusapin, Zubin Mehta
2007	Future – Quest for energy	James E. Hansen, Jerry Olson, Sarah Kurtz
2008	Past – Creative Rendering of the Past	Amos Oz, Tom Stoppard, Atom Egoyan
2008	Present – Social responsibility	Al Gore
2008	Future – Geosciences	Ellen Mosley-Thompson & Lonnie Thompson, Geoffrey Eglinton
2009	Past – Astrophysics – History of the Universe	Paolo de Bernardis, Andrew E. Lange, Paul Linford Richards
2009	Present – Leadership	Tony Blair
2009	Future – Global Public health	Robert Gallo
2010	Past – March Towards Democracy	Giorgio Napolitano
2010	Present – Literature: Rendition of the 20th Century	Margaret Atwood, Amitav Ghosh
2010	Future – Computers and Telecommunications	Leonard Kleinrock, Gordon E. Moore, Michael O. Rabin
2011	Past – Evolution	Marcus Feldman
2011	Present – Cinema and Society	Coen Brothers
2011	Future – Ageing: Facing the Challenge	Cynthia Kenyon, Gary Ruvkun
2012	Past – History/Biography	Robert Conquest, Martin Gilbert
2012	Present – Plastic arts	William Kentridge
2012	Future – Genome Research	David Botstein, Eric Lander, J. Craig Venter
2013	Past – Classics, the Modern Legacy of the Ancient World	Geoffrey Lloyd
2013	Present – Ideas, Public Intellectuals and Contemporary Philosophers	Michel Serres, Leon Wieseltier
2013	Future – Preventive Medicine	Esther Duflo, Alfred Sommer
2014	Past – History and Memory	Krzysztof Czyzewski, Pierre Nora, Saul Friedländer
2014	Present – Combating Memory Loss	John A. Hardy, Peter St George-Hyslop, Brenda Milner
2014	Future – Artificial Intelligence, The Digital Mind	Marvin Minsky
2015	Past – Retrieving the Past: Historians and their Sources	Peter Brown, Alessandro Portelli
2015	Present – The Information Revolution	Jimmy Wales
2015	Future – Bioinformatics	Cyrus Chothia, David Haussler, Michael Waterman
2016	Past – Social History – New Directions	Inga Clendinnen, Arlette Farge
2016	Present – Combatting Poverty	Anthony B. Atkinson, François Bourguignon, James J. Heckman
2016	Future – Nanoscience	Paul Alivisatos, Chad Mirkin, John Pendry
2017	Past – Archeology and Natural Sciences	Svante Pääbo, David Reich
2017	Present – Literature	Jamaica Kincaid, A. B. Yehoshua
2017	Future – Astronomy	Neil Gehrels, Shrinivas Kulkarni, Andrzej Udalski
2018	Past – History of Science	Lorraine Daston, Evelyn Fox Keller, Simon Schaffer
2018	Present – Bioethics	Ezekiel Emanuel, Jonathan Glover, Mary Warnock
2018	Future – Personalized Medicine	Carlo M. Croce, Mary-Claire King, Bert Vogelstein
2019	Past – Macro History	Kenneth Pomeranz, Sanjay Subrahmanyam
2019	Present – Defending Democracy	Michael Ignatieff, Reporters Without Borders
2019	Future – Combatting Climate Change	Christiana Figueres
2020	Past – Cultural Preservation and Revival	Lonnie G. Bunch III, Barbara Kirshenblatt-Gimblett
2020	Present – Gender Equality	Gita Sen, Debora Diniz
2020	Future – Artificial Intelligence	Demis Hassabis, Amnon Shashua
2021	Past – History of Health and Medicine	Alison Bashford, Katharine Park, Keith Wailoo
2021	Present – Public Health	Anthony Fauci
2021	Future – Molecular Medicine	Zelig Eshhar, Carl H. June, Steven Rosenberg

== Winners (2022–present) ==
Year	Winner	Field
2022	Mirjam Brusius	Visual and material culture in global and colonial contexts
2022	Bartow Elmore	Environmental history of global capitalism
2022	Tyrone McKinley Freeman	History of African American philanthropy
2022	Verena Krebs	Medieval Ethiopia and cross-cultural encounters
2022	Efthymia Nikita	Bioarchaeology of the Mediterranean
2022	Nana Oforiatta Ayim	Curator, writer, artist and art historian centering African heritage
2022	Kristina Richardson	Medieval Islamic world and the Roma
2022	Natalia Romik	Architect and public historian who works to preserve the memory of Jewish life in Eastern Europe
2022	Kimberly Welch	Legal history of the antebellum South
2023	Saheed Aderinto	Social and cultural historian of modern Africa, deploying unusual lenses and categories like sexuality, childhood, guns, animals and music for understanding the Nigerian past
2023	Ana Antic	Historian of psychiatry and twentieth-century Europe, exploring issues of politics, violence and mental health
2023	Karma Ben Johanan	Intellectual historian of inter-religious encounters, focusing on Catholic–Jewish interactions
2023	Elise K. Burton	Historian of science, race and nationalism in the modern Middle East, focusing on genetics, physical anthropology, and evolutionary biology
2023	Adam Clulow	Global historian of Europe and East Asia, deploying video games and virtual reality for popularising history
2023	Krista Goff	Historian using oral history and everyday sources in understanding experiences of understudied ethnic minorities in the Soviet Union.
2023	Stephanie E. Jones-Rogers	Historian exploring women's social, economic and legal relationships to enslaved people and to the slave trade in the trans-Atlantic world.
2023	Anita Radini	“Archaeologist of dirt” analyzing the tiny remains of dust that collect in dental plaque, for learning about the work lives and environments of people in the past
2023	Chao Tayiana Maina	Public historian using digital technologies to capture and preserve previously hidden or suppressed historical narratives in Kenya.
2024	Keisha N. Blain	Black internationalism and Black women's activism in the 20th century
2024	Benjamin Brose	Cultural histories of Buddhism and Asian religion
2024	Cécile Fromont	Visual and material cultures of Early modern Africa, Latin America and Europe
2024	Cat Jarman	Archaeology of the Viking Age and public archaeology
2024	Daniel Jütte	Cultural histories of material objects and everyday technologies in Europe
2024	Stuart M. McManus	Global histories of the Renaissance and of slavery
2024	Kathryn Olivarius	Disease, citizenship and economics in the antebellum South of the United States
2024	Katarzyna Person	Holocaust archives and the recovery of marginalized voices
2024	Tripurdaman Singh	Colonialism, decolonisation and the birth of democracy in South Asia
2025	Abidemi Babatunde Babalola	Anthropological archaeology of science and technology in West Africa
2025	Mackenzie Cooley	Nature and medicine in the early modern world
2025	Bar Kribus	Ethiopian archaeology and the history and material culture of the Beta Israel (Ethiopian Jews)
2025	Fred Kuwornu	Documentary filmmaker exploring identity, race and historical representation
2025	Dmitri Levitin	Early modern intellectual history and the history of knowledge
2025	Beth Lew-Williams	Race and migration in the modern US
2025	Hannah Marcus	Science and scientific culture in early modern Europe
2025	Alina Șerban	Roma history, culture and identity through film and theater
2025	Caroline Sturdy Colls	Archaeology of the Holocaust and sites of genocide
2026	R. Isabela Morales	Public history of slavery and emancipation in the US
2026	Verena Meier	Persecution of Roma and Sinti in modern Europe; University of Heidelberg / Technical University of Berlin
2026	Giancarlo Marcone Flores	Archaeology of pre-Hispanic Peru and participative heritage; Universidad de Ingeniería y Tecnología – UTEC, Peru
2026	Andrew Lipman	History of early modern North America Barnard College; Columbia University
2026	Dagomar Degroot	History of environmental change on Earth and across the solar system; Georgetown University
2026	Howard Chiang	Modern East Asian medicine, gender and sexuality; University of California, Santa Barbara
2026	Matthew Champion	History of premodern temporalities; University of Melbourne
2026	Roland Betancourt	Byzantine art history and contemporary popular culture; University of California, Irvine
2026	Max Bergholz	Intercommunal violence, nationalism and memory in modern Europe; Concordia University, Montreal, Canada

== See also ==
- List of history awards
