= Tripurdaman Singh =

Indian historian of modern South Asia (born 1988)

- Born: 1988 (age 37–38); Agra, Uttar Pradesh, India
- Occupation: Historian
- Awards: Ramnath Goenka Award (2023); Dan David Prize (2024)

Academic background
- Education: University of Warwick (BA); University of Cambridge (MPhil, PhD)

Academic work
- Discipline: History
- Sub-discipline: Modern South Asian history, constitutional history, decolonisation
- Institutions: Institute of Commonwealth Studies, University of London; Geneva Graduate Institute
- Notable works: Sixteen Stormy Days (2020); Nehru: The Debates that Defined India (2021)

Tripurdaman Singh (born 1988) is an Indian historian of modern South Asia. His research deals with colonialism, decolonisation, state formation and constitution-making in India, and he has written on the origins of Indian constitutional practice and on the early years of Indian democracy. He is the author of Imperial Sovereignty and Local Politics (2019) and Sixteen Stormy Days (2020), and the co-author, with Adeel Hussain, of Nehru: The Debates that Defined India (2021). He was awarded the Dan David Prize in 2024.

== Early life and education ==
Singh was born in 1988 in Agra, Uttar Pradesh. He attended St Peter's College, Agra.

He read politics and international studies at the University of Warwick, and then took an MPhil in Modern South Asian Studies and a PhD in history at the University of Cambridge. His doctoral research was supervised by the historian C. A. Bayly, who died in 2015. Singh dedicated the book that grew out of the thesis to Bayly's memory, describing him as "my supervisor at Cambridge" and writing that the work "would never have seen the light of day without his generosity, faith, encouragement and constant guidance".

== Career ==
Singh held a fellowship of the Indian Council of Historical Research at the University of Agra. He was subsequently a British Academy Postdoctoral Fellow at the Institute of Commonwealth Studies, School of Advanced Study, University of London, where from 2019 to 2022 he ran a project titled "Negotiating Decolonisation in India's Princely States". He has since been an Associate Research Fellow of the same institute.

He has held visiting positions at the International Institute for Asian Studies in Leiden and at the Fondation Maison des Sciences de l'Homme in Paris, where he was resident at the Maison Suger in April and May 2022 working on a project on constitutionalism, democracy and minority rights in India. In the autumn of 2024 he was a fellow of the Forum Basiliense at the University of Basel, continuing work on decolonisation in India's princely states.

As of September 2026 he is a researcher at the Albert Hirschman Centre on Democracy at the Geneva Graduate Institute, where he holds a Swiss National Science Foundation Ambizione Fellowship.

Singh is a Fellow of the Royal Asiatic Society and a Fellow of the Royal Historical Society, and is listed as an affiliated scholar of the Centre of South Asian Studies at the University of Cambridge.

Alongside his academic work he writes for general audiences, including The Times of India, The Indian Express, ThePrint and the BBC World Service.

His books have been translated into Hindi, Tamil and French.

== Work ==
=== Imperial Sovereignty and Local Politics ===
Singh's first book, Imperial Sovereignty and Local Politics: The Bhadauria Rajputs and the Transition from Mughal to British India, 1600–1900, was published by Cambridge University Press in 2019. It traces the fortunes of the Bhadauria Rajput lineage of Bhadawar across the shift from Mughal to British rule.

=== Sixteen Stormy Days ===
Sixteen Stormy Days: The Story of the First Amendment to the Constitution of India was published by Penguin Random House India in 2020, with a later edition from Bloomsbury in 2024. The book reconstructs the parliamentary fight over the First Amendment of 1951, which altered protections for free speech, permitted reservations, changed property rights and limited judicial review of amendments. It has been translated into Hindi as Ve Solah Din.

The book was reviewed widely in the Indian press. Zareer Masani, writing in Open, called it concise and readable and praised Singh's handling of the opposition to the amendment. Somak Ghoshal in Mint found the analysis compelling, and Amrinder Singh in The Tribune described it as expertly researched, concise and readable. Soni Mishra, in The Week, described the episode it covers as the first battle of Indian liberalism. It was also reviewed by Ratika Gaur in the journal South Asia Research. The book won the Ramnath Goenka Award in the books category.

=== Nehru: The Debates that Defined India ===
Nehru: The Debates that Defined India, written with the legal scholar Adeel Hussain, was published by William Collins and by Fourth Estate at HarperCollins India in 2021. It examines Jawaharlal Nehru through his arguments with four contemporaries: Muhammad Iqbal on Muslim solidarity and religion in public life, Muhammad Ali Jinnah on Hindu-Muslim relations, Vallabhbhai Patel on foreign policy, and Syama Prasad Mookerjee on civil liberties and the First Amendment. The exchanges are reproduced alongside the authors' commentary. The authors have said that the debates were chosen because "the questions that Nehru and his contemporaries debated have now been reopened as political fault-lines in contemporary discourse".

==== Reception ====
The book carried pre-publication endorsements from several writers and scholars. Shashi Tharoor called it "an important contribution" that "deftly outlines the thinking and dialogue that laid the foundations of the Republic". Sunil Khilnani wrote that it "reminds us of an era when Indian politics thrummed with ideas and arguments, articulated with conviction and civility". Faisal Devji of the University of Oxford described it as an "innovative book" that "allows us to understand Nehru's legacy by focussing on some of the most important debates of his career", and Swapan Dasgupta said the authors had "brought to life the intellectual vibrancy and excitement that surrounded the debates".

Reviewing the book in the Journal of Contemporary Asia, Sharmila Narayana of the School of Law, Christ University, Bangalore, wrote that Singh and Hussain "present a balanced picture of Nehru, with all his follies and sagaciousness", and that the exchanges they assemble "graphically record the intellectual engagement that Nehru had with his detractors", revealing "his intellectual acumen and intolerance towards all kinds of religious bigotry". She judged the book "all the more relevant today, in an environment that spews hatred and has become a breeding ground for religious intolerance", while taking issue with the authors' account of Mookerjee's secular credentials during the First Amendment debate.

Writing in The Friday Times, the Pakistani barrister and biographer of Jinnah Yasser Latif Hamdani treated the book as a significant source for Pakistani as well as Indian history, describing the debates it assembles as "rich primary source material" on constitutional freedoms and Hindu-Muslim relations, and used its framing to argue that the same exchanges "equally defined Pakistan".

Sunny Kumar, reviewing the book in The Tribune, wrote that the selection of exchanges between Nehru and "his most articulate contemporaries like Muhammad Iqbal, Muhammad Ali Jinnah, Sardar Patel and Shyama Prasad Mookerjee fills its readers with excitement", while judging that the editorial introduction and analysis "could have been more comprehensive and incisive".

The book also drew criticism. Reviewing it for The Wire, the former diplomat Talmiz Ahmad judged the authors unfair to Nehru, particularly on foreign policy and on the claim that Nehru suppressed political alternatives, while allowing that the reproduction of the debates themselves was valuable.

=== Other writing ===
In 2023 Singh published "The Authoritarian Roots of India's Democracy" in the Journal of Democracy, arguing that authoritarian capacity is embedded in India's constitutional and political structures rather than being a recent departure from them.

== Awards ==
- Ramnath Goenka Excellence in Journalism Award, books category, for Sixteen Stormy Days. The award was presented at a ceremony on 23 March 2023 covering the 2019 and 2020 award years, and carried a prize of ₹100,000 and a trophy.
- Dan David Prize, 2024. Singh was one of nine historians named that year, each receiving US$300,000.

== Selected publications ==
- Singh, Tripurdaman (2019). Imperial Sovereignty and Local Politics: The Bhadauria Rajputs and the Transition from Mughal to British India, 1600–1900. Cambridge University Press. ISBN 978-1-108-49743-5.
- Singh, Tripurdaman (2020). Sixteen Stormy Days: The Story of the First Amendment to the Constitution of India. Penguin Random House India. ISBN 978-0-670-09287-1.
- Singh, Tripurdaman; Hussain, Adeel (2021). Nehru: The Debates that Defined India. William Collins. ISBN 978-0-00-846382-3.
- Singh, Tripurdaman (2020). "India: the lingering ghosts of Nehru's constitutional legerdemain". The Round Table. 109 (3): 344–345. doi:10.1080/00358533.2020.1757290.
- Singh, Tripurdaman (2023). "The Authoritarian Roots of India's Democracy". Journal of Democracy. 34 (3).
