= Chao Tayiana Maina =

Kenyan historian and digital heritage specialist

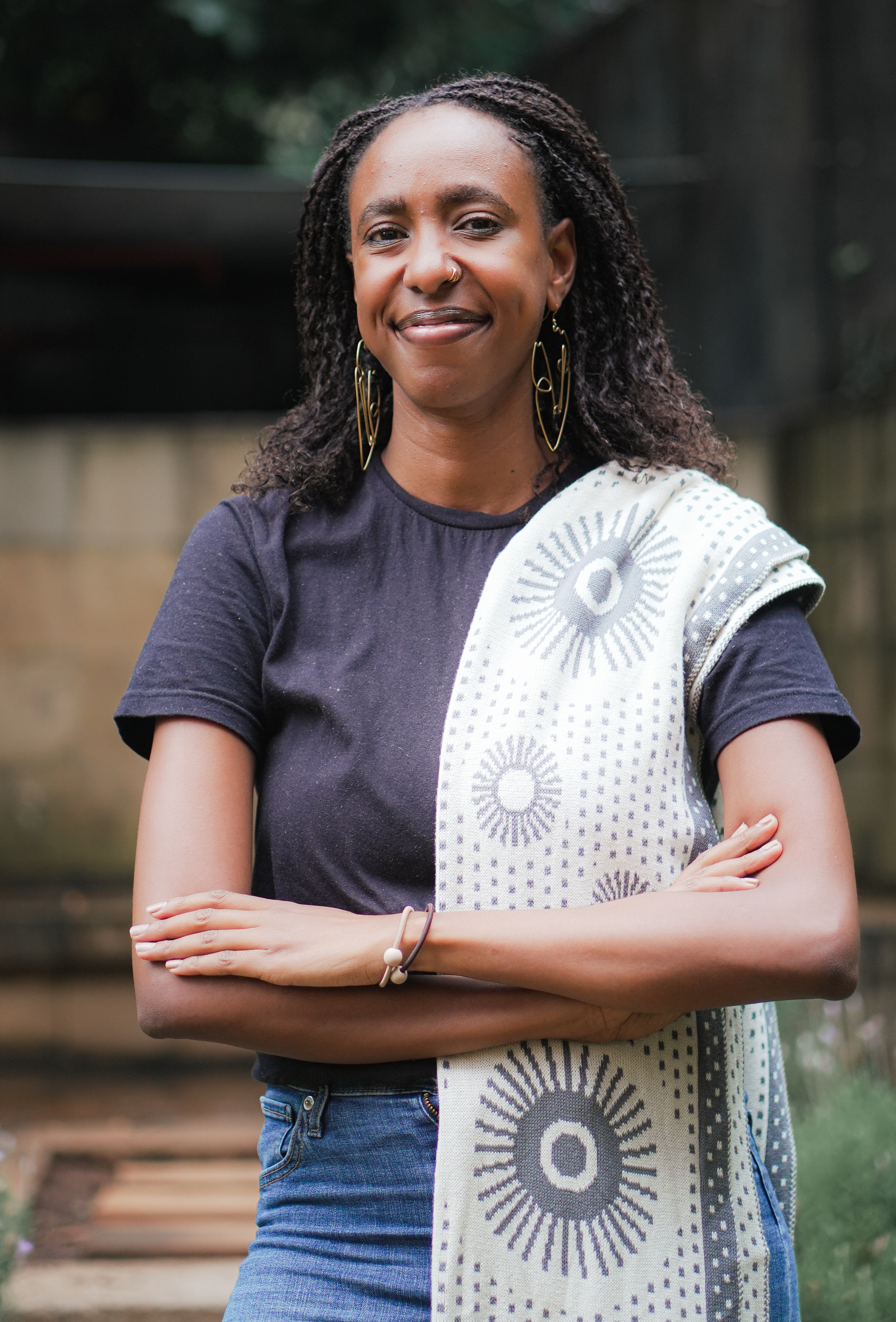
- Born: 1993
- Education: Jomo Kenyatta University of Agriculture and Technology, Glasgow School of Art
- Occupation: Historian
- Awards: Dan David Prize (2023)
- Website: headstronghistorian.com

Chao Tayiana Maina (born 1993) is a Kenyan historian and digital heritage specialist.

== Early life and education ==
Tayiana spent her childhood in Ngong, which is a town located in Kajiado County within the Rift Valley region of Kenya. She was raised in an inter-generational homestead by her mother and maternal grandparents, she credits this setting for fostering in her a keen awareness and love for history. She attended the Jomo Kenyatta University of Agriculture and Technology where she graduated with a Bachelor of Science degree in math and computer science. She continued her education at Glasgow School of Art in Scotland where she acquired a master's degree in international heritage visualization.

== Career ==
During her schooling days at Jomo Kenyatta University of Agriculture and Technology, she started a volunteer project "Save The Railway" which documented the history and memories associated with the 19th century Uganda Railway. Prompted by the demolition of old stations to pave way for the construction of the new Standard Gauge Railway, Tayiana became interested in moving beyond romanticized tales of Tsavo Man Eaters to understand what the decline of the railway meant for everyday Kenyans who were dependent on it for over a century. Between 2012 - 2016 she travelled from Mombasa to Kisumu, documenting more than 50 stations and creating one of the largest photographic archives of contemporary railway history in Kenya.

In 2018, she co-founded the Museum of British Colonialism, an online volunteer collective elevating underrepresented histories of the British colonial empire. As part of the collective she coordinated efforts to find and document present day remains of several former detention camps set up by the British during the State of Emergency. In response to destruction of archives, difficulty in accessing visual imagery on the Mau Mau rebellion and political suppression of this history in post-independence Kenya, Tayiana and team created a digital archive containing photographs, videos and 3D reconstructions of former detention camps. Critically showing how sites of detention in present day Kenya have today become schools and prisons and how logics of incarceration still continue to govern everyday spaces today.

Recognizing the need to invest in and support digital initiatives within African museums, Tayiana founded African Digital Heritage, a non-profit organisation based in Nairobi in 2019. The organization which has worked with museums in several African countries focuses on digitization, innovation, research, and capacity building, with a commitment to preserving and promoting African histories. She sees digital platforms as transformative tools for making historical archives more accessible, driven by a growing demand among younger generations for readily available historical information. This vision has shaped her work in developing platforms that bring archives and stories closer to the public.

In 2020, Tayiana started a passion project Open Restitution Africa (ORA) along with her co-founder Molemo Moiloa . The project gathers data on current restitution processes and provides case studies compiled along with scholars to reframe narratives around the repatriation of historical cultural objects from museums and private collections.

== Fellowships and Awards ==
- Yale Director's Forum Fellow (2023-2025)
- Public Historian In Residence (2023) - University of Luxembourg
- 100 Most Influential Africans (2023) - New African
- Dan David Prize (2023)

== Publications ==
- Locating Kenya's emergency detention camps: place, memory, and the afterlives of colonial violence
