= Mirjam Brusius =

German science historian

Mirjam Brusius FRHistS
- Born: Mirjam Sarah Brusius
- Occupations: Historian and academic
- Awards: Aby Warburg Prize (2016); Dan David Prize (2022)

Academic background
- Education: Humboldt-Universität zu Berlin; University of Cambridge

Academic work
- Discipline: History
- Sub-discipline: Cultural history; History of science; History of photography; History of colonialism
- Institutions: Max Planck Institute for the History of Science; Harvard University; Trinity College, Oxford; German Historical Institute London

Mirjam Sarah Brusius FRHistS is a cultural historian and historian of science. She is currently Research Fellow in Colonial and Global History at the German Historical Institute London. She specialises in the history of photography, museums, collecting and race in colonial contexts.

Brusius is a fellow of the Royal Historical Society, a member the Global Young Academy and current recipient of the Dan David Prize, now the largest history prize in the world.

== Research ==
Brusius’ historical research and curatorial work focuses on the circulation of objects and images in and between Europe, the Middle East, and South Asia; from the movement of ancient artefacts in indigenous contexts in the Ottoman Empire and Persia into the racial hierarchies and archives of Western museums, to the trajectories of photographic technologies out of Europe and into the Islamic world.

Her work expands traditional fields of heritage studies by combining critical material culture research with an understanding of global and colonial history, cross-cultural ‘object biographies’, Science and Technology Studies (STS), and curatorial practice.

Brusius’ work in the history of museums and collecting asks where museum objects come from and where they go, why some objects are displayed while others remain in storage, and what happens to repatriated objects. She also explores the scientific misuse of antiquities and the afterlife of objects beyond museums. She is currently completing a book on the movement of ancient artefacts from the Middle East to Western museums (for Oxford University Press), and is researching for a short monograph on the politics of museum storage.

Her most recent book on the inventor of photography, W.H.F. Talbot (forthcoming, The University of Chicago Press) is a revised and comprehensive study of Talbot, in the context of science, empire and the archive. The book expands on her earlier work on Talbot, including the edited volume 'W.H.F. Talbot: Beyond Photography' (with Katrina Dean and Chitra Ramalingam), published by Yale University Press in 2013 and her 2015 monograph on Talbot (De Gruyter, in German).

Brusius published widely in peer-reviewed journals and is a regular media contributor on issues related to memory culture in Britain and Germany. She has written for the Guardian, Süddeutsche Zeitung and Frankfurter Allgemeine Zeitung, amongst others, and she appeared on BBC 4, and various German national radio stations.

== Curatorial work and research ==
Brusius is concerned with communicating her research to a broader public through curatorial platforms. She is a co-founder of '100 Histories of 100 Worlds in 1 Object' an award-winning grassroots project, which aims at diversifying object biographies by foregrounding voices of people of colour and scholars from the Global South. She is also a member of the curatorial network Museum Detox.

In 2021 she was co-Principal Investigator of the Interdisciplinary Fellows Group ‘The 4R. Reality or Transcultural Aphasia?’ at the Merian Institute for Advanced Studies in Africa (MIASA) in Accra, Ghana. The group was a pilot to set up best practice models for repatriation. The group's aim was also to move the material debate about the 4Rs (Restitution, Return, Repatriation and Reparation) from a practical to an epistemological level.

Between 2012 and 2017, Brusius was a PI in an international focus group on museums for the Indian-European Advanced Research Network. This has led to a series of meetings across Europe and India, which have brought together scholars, curators, directors and decision makers. It led to the volume Museum Storage and Meaning: Tales from the Crypt (2018) which she co-edited with Kavita Singh (JNU Delhi). It addressing the remarkably overlooked fact that the vast majority of museum collections are out of sight to the public from a global and cross-cultural angle.

== Education ==
Brusius completed her master's degree in Art History, Cultural Studies and Musicology at the Humboldt-Universität zu Berlin in 2007. She then went on to gain a PhD in History and Philosophy of Science from the University of Cambridge in 2011. Her thesis examined the antiquarian and scientific interests of inventor of photographer William Henry Fox Talbot. This was supported by an AHRC Collaborative Doctoral Award, amongst others, in conjunction with the British Library, where she catalogued a comprehensive archive of W.H.F. Talbot.

== Career ==
Brusius has held various fellowships for her research. In 2011, she received a Small Research Grant by the British Academy. In 2011–2013 she was postdoctoral fellow at the Max Planck Institute for the History of Science. In 2012–2013 she was a Fulbright and Volkswagen Scholar at the Mahindra Humanities Center at Harvard University. During this time she was also a Visiting Fellow of Harvard's Department of the History of Science, and a Fellow of the Aga Khan Program for Islamic Architecture (Harvard and MIT). This was followed by the A.W. Mellon Postdoctoral Fellowship, and a Junior Research Fellowship at the University of Oxford (Faculty of History, Trinity College, TORCH).

She was a short-term fellow at the Kunsthistorisches Institut in Florenz (MPI), Yale University, the University of Sydney, the University of Melbourne, and a senior fellow at CARMAH and the Berlin Graduate School Muslim Cultures and Societies, both in Berlin. In 2019 she was a Fellow at Italian Academy for Advanced Studies in America, Columbia University, Weinberg Fellow.

== Awards and honours ==
In 2022, she was awarded the prestigious Dan David Prize which “recognizes outstanding scholarship that illuminates the past and seeks to anchor public discourse in a deeper understanding of history.

In 2018, she was awarded the British Science Association's Jacob Bronowski Award Lecture for Science and the Arts. In the same year she won the Maurice Daumas Prize of the International Committee for the History of Technology for the best article in the History of Technology 2018.^{.}

In 2016 Brusius was awarded the Aby Warburg Prize for Early Career Researchers, awarded every four years by the city of Hamburg, Germany.

== Books and select edited volumes ==
The Absence of Photography. William Henry Fox Talbot, Empire, Science, and the Antique [under contract and final review, The University of Chicago Press]

Fotografie und museales Wissen: William Henry Fox Talbot, das Altertum und die Absenz der Fotografie (Berlin, 2015)

with K. Singh (eds), Museum Storage and Meaning: Tales from the Crypt (London, 2018)

(ed.), What is Preservation? Diversifying Engagement with the Middle East’s material Past, Round Table, Review of Middle East Studies, 51/2 (2017)

with T. Dunkelgrün (eds), Photography, Antiquity, Scholarship, Special Issue, History of Photography, 40/3 (2016)

with K. Dean and C. Ramalingam (eds), William Henry Fox Talbot: Beyond Photography (New Haven/London, 2013)

== Select articles ==
‘Dekolonisiert die Museumsinsel. Museumsnarrative, Rassentheorie und radikale Chancen einer zu stillen Debatte’, in A. Epple, T. Sandkühler, J. Zimmerer (eds): Geschichtskultur durch Restitution? Ein Kunst-Historikerstreit (Köln 2021), 125-44

‘On Connecting the Ancient and the Modern Middle East in Museums and Public Space’, in Sharon McDonald, Katarzyna Puzon and Mirjam Shatanawi (eds.), Islam and Heritage in Europe (London, forthcoming), 183–201

‘Hitting two Birds with One Stone: An Afterword on Archeology and the History of Science’, History of Science, 55/3 (2017), 383–91

‘Introduction: What is Preservation?’, Review of Middle East Studies, 51/2 (2017), 177–82

‘The Field in the Museum: Puzzling out Babylon in Berlin’, Osiris, 32 (2017), 264–85

‘Photography’s Fits and Starts: The Search for Antiquity and its Image in Victorian Britain’, History of Photography, 40/3 (2016), 250–66

‘Towards a History of Preservation Practices: Archaeology, Heritage and the History of Science’, Round Table on ‘Science Studies’, International Journal of Middle East Studies, 47/3 (2015), 574–9
