= Krzysztof Czyżewski =

Polish editor (born 1958)

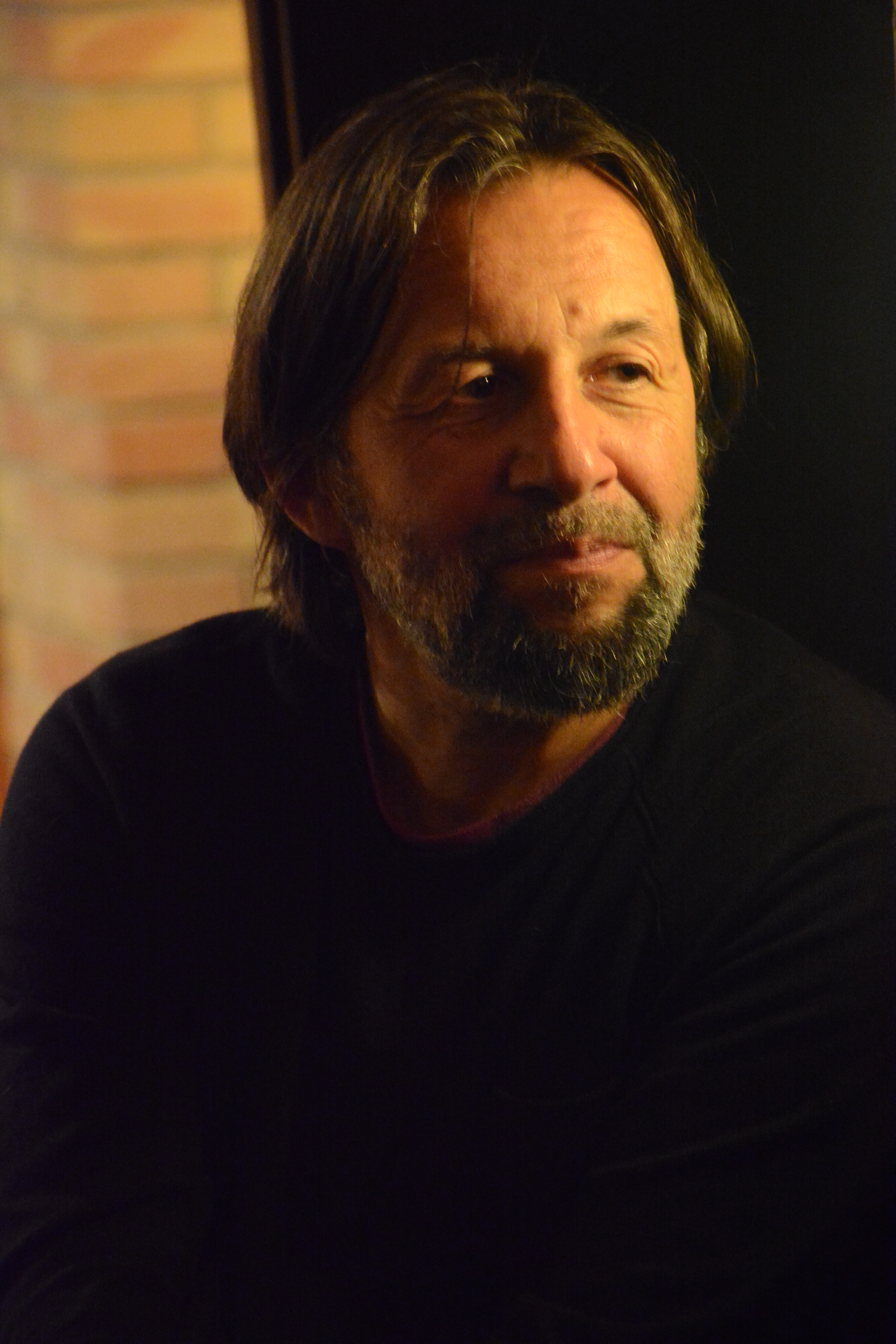
- Born: Krzysztof Czyżewski; 6 July 1958 (age 68); Warsaw, Poland
- Awards: Dan David Prize (2017); Aleksander Gieysztor Prize (2007)

Academic background
- Education: Adam Mickiewicz University, Poznań

Krzysztof Czyżewski (born 6 July 1958 in Warsaw) is a Polish author, one of the initiators of the Borderland Foundation in Sejny, Poland.

== Biography ==
He is a graduate in Polish literature from Adam Mickiewicz University in Poznań. Initially closely related to the avant-garde theatre movements. He was one of the co-creators of the "Gardzienice" Theatre with which he worked from 1977 up to 1983.

In 1983, during the martial law in Poland he establishes the periodical "Czas Kultury" (Time of Culture), which after 1989 came of the "underground" (became legal). In the second half of the eighties he has been giving lectures about the history of culture and aesthetics in the Academy of Fine Arts in Poznań. At the same time he establishes the "Arka" theatre and initiates the "Meeting Village" project in Czarna Dabrówka in Kaszuby Region in which alternative theatre and culture creators of all Europe and America has been participating.

In 1990, he became one of the initiators of the "Borderland" Foundation and its president. In 1991, he established the Centre "Borderland of Cultures, Arts, Nations" and became its director. It is a cultural institution co-founded by Ministry of Culture and National Heritage and Podlaskie Province Regional Assembly Government. The centre is located in a small town Sejny, former “shtetl”, on the Polish-Lithuanian-Belarusian borderland. The “Borderland” revitalized the Jewish quarter in a very centre of the town, and has its studios for art and education programs in former Hebrew gymnasium, yeshiva and synagogue.

In 2011, June 30, for the centenary of Czesław Miłosz's birth and for the beginning of Polish Presidency in European Union, together with his Borderland team he opened an International Center for Dialog in Krasnogruda near Sejny in the reconstructed manor house of once Milosz's family.

In the framework of the Foundation and The Centre he realizes among others the following projects: Meeting the Other or on Virtue of Tolerance, The Memory of Ancient Times, Home – Nest – Temple, Central European Cultural Forum, Open Region of Central and Eastern Europe, The Borderland Culture Documentary Centre, The Borderland School, Class of Cultural Heritage, Café Europa, Glass Bead Game, Mobile Academy “New Agora”, Laboratories of Intercultural Dialog, Tales of Coexistence, Medea/Ponte.In 2007 he was invited by University of Michigan to deliver a prestigious “Copernicus Lecture”.

He was a lecturer and speaker of the University of Fine Arts in Poznań, University of Warsaw, Vilnius University, New School University (New York), Transregional Center for Democratic Studies (Cracow), Salzburg Seminar, Center for Humanities at Lviv University, Ilia State University in Tbilisi, Harvard University, University of California, Berkeley, the University of Michigan, Ann Arbor, and the Public Libraries of New York, Los Angeles, and Toronto. From the spring semester of 2015 he is a visiting professor of Rutgers University (Urban Civic Initiative) and University of Bologna.

He coordinates several projects about intercultural dialogue in Europe, Caucasus, Central Asia, Indonesia, Bhutan and United States.

He was an artistic director of the Lublin candidacy for European Capital of Culture and was nominated as an artistic director of European Capital of Culture Wroclaw 2016, keeping this position for years 2012–2013.

For many years he was a member of the Art and Culture Sub-Board in Open Society Institute in Budapest and a President of European Network of Literary Centers HALMA (Berlin). He is a Chairman of the Jury of the Irena Sendlerowa Prize (Warsaw) and a President of the Board of Eastern Partnership Congress of Culture (Lublin).

Member of the Remarque Circle (New York University), Board of the Czeslaw Milosz Birthplace Foundation (Kaunas), The International Institute for the Study of Culture and Education (Wroclaw), The Art and Modernity Foundation (Warsaw). In 2003 he was elected to the Ashoka Fellowship.

In 1993 he becomes the founder and editor-in-chief of the "Krasnogruda" magazine, devoted to Central and Eastern European cultures, art and literature. He is editor of Borderland Publishing House, in charge of the series “Meridian” and “Neighbours”.

He lives in Krasnogruda on Polish-Lithuanian border with wife Małgorzata and two children, Weronika and Stanislaw.

== Writings ==
He published regularly his essays in 'Kultura' (Paris). He is translated into many languages and published in different countries (among others USA, Austria, Germany, Lithuania, Belarus, Ukraine, Romania, Slovakia, Czech Republic, Hungary, Bosnia & Hercegovina, Croatia, Slovenia, Macedonia, Yugoslavia, France, Canada).

In 2001 he published both in USA and Poland his book-manifesto “The Path of the Borderland”. In 2008 his new collection of essays was published under the title “Line of Return. Notes from the Borderland” (Cogito Prize nomination for the best book in 2008). Other books: “The Ethos of the Borderland” (Belgrade 2010), “The Stranger – The Other – The Kin: A Conversation on the River Bank” (Lviv-Kyiv 2010), and “The Line of Return. Notes from the Borderland” (Kyiv 2013). In 2014 he published a book on Czesław Miłosz: “Miłosz. A Connective Tissue”. Co-author and editor of the books “Trust and Identity. A Handbook of Dialogue” (Sejny 2011) and “Miłosz – Dialogue – Borderland” (Sejny 2011).

== Awards and honors ==
- POLCUL Foundation Prize, Melbourne, 1992
- Stanisław Wyspiański Prize for Young Artists, 1992
- The Paris-based "Culture" (Kultura) Magazine Prize for the Year 1996
- Gabor Bethlen Prize, Budapest, 1998
- Small Sceptre of Polish Culture Prize founded by Jerzy Giedroyć, 1999
- Medal of St. George from editors and readers of Tygodnik Powszechny together with Tadeusz Mazowiecki, Cracow, 2000
- Order of Gediminas from President of Lithuania Valdas Adamkus, 2001
- Israeli Ambassador Szewach Weiss, awarded him an honorary prize for merits in preserving Jewish cultural heritage in Poland, 2001
- Polish Minister of Foreign Affairs Award, together with Władysław Bartoszewski, for the promoting Polish culture in the world, 2001
- Ecumenical Foundation "Tolerance" Prize with the title "Meritorious for the Tolerance, 2003
- Alexander Langer Prize, Rome, 2004
- Dialog Award, Berlin, 2006
- Central European Award "New Culture of New Europe" at the Krynica Economic Forum, 2007
- Aleksander Gieysztor Prize from the Kroneberg Foundation for innovation and dedication in protecting cultural heritage, 2007
- Ambassador of European Year of Intercultural Dialog nomination, Brussels, 2008
- Pontifex Award, Warsaw, 2008
- Medal of Tolerance from the World Congress of Esperanto, 2009
- President of Poland, Lech Kaczyński, awarded him with an Officer's Cross of the Order of Polonia Restituta, 2011
- Dan David Prize for his contribution to "History and Memory", 2014
- Irena Sendler Award, 2015
- Neptun Award of the City of Gdańsk, 2017
- Józef Tischner Award, 2018
