= Abidemi Babatunde Babalola =

Nigerian archaeologist

- Education: University of Ibadan (BA, MA); University of Rice (MA, PhD)
- Occupation: Archaeologist
- Awards: Dan David Prize

Abidemi Babatunde Babalola is a Nigerian archaeologist. He is the lead archaeologist for the Museum of West African Art and a research fellow at the British Museum. He has received a number of awards for his work, leading up to the Dan David Prize from Tel Aviv University in 2025.

== Education ==
Babalola studied in the Department of Archaeology and Anthropology at the University of Ibadan in Nigeria, where he earned a bachelor's degree and master's degree. He went on to study at Rice University in Houston, Texas, earning a second master's degree, and a doctor of philosophy in anthropological archaeology.

== Career ==
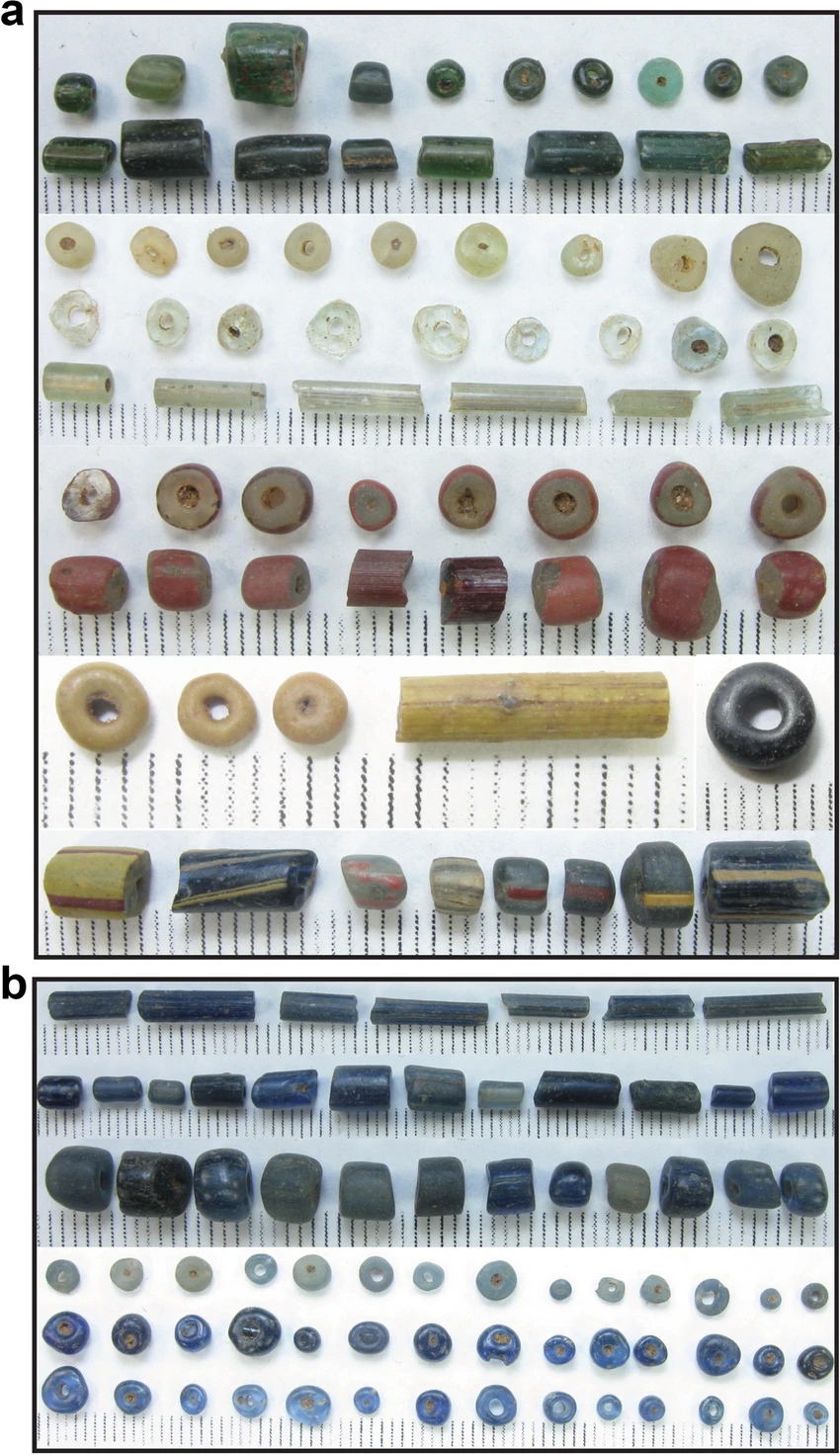
Glass beads from Excavation at Igbo Olokun in 2017

Babalola works at the British Museum as an anthropological archaeologist, as of 2025. He works with material science to research the "history of technological development in premodern West Africa". He is the lead archaeologist for the Museum of West African Art's Archaeology Project in Benin City, Nigeria.

His research, based on work in Ile-Ife, Nigeria, has shown that West African glass production had been developed centuries before European colonialism, challenging prior notions about the history of African technology. The Dan David Prize organisers also noted his public outreach in Nigeria, bringing knowledge from archaeological research to the communities connected to his work. His team found 12,000 glass beads and other production materials from between the 11th and 15th centuries at the Igbo Olokun site, made with high levels of lime and alumina, which only exists in that region. This showed Yoruba scientific and artistic development used local materials, such as feldspar and snail shells.

He has held fellowships at several institutions between 2016 and 2024, including at the University of Cambridge, Harvard University, University College London-Doha, and the Cyprus Institute.

== Awards ==
He has received a number of awards for his work, including:

- Discovery Award (2019) — Shanghai Archaeology Forum
- Blaze O’Connor Award (2022) — World Archaeological Congress
- Conservation and Heritage Site Award (2025) — Archaeological Institute of America
- Dan David Prize (2025)

== Publications ==
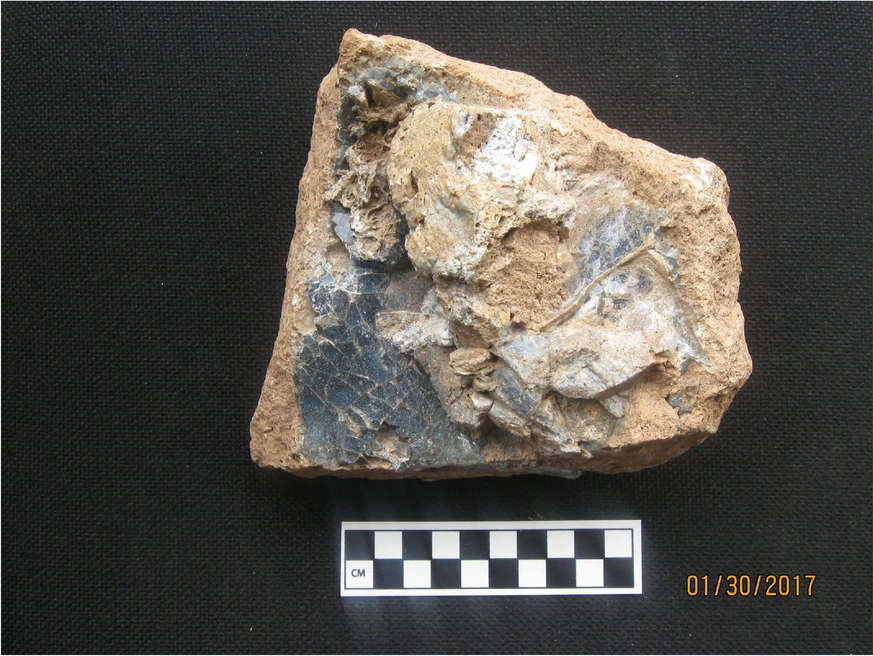

- Semi-finished glass from Ile-Ife, Nigeria: implications for the archaeology of glass in sub-Saharan Africa
- Digitization of glass bead-making, use and meaning in Ile-Ife, Southwestern Nigeria
