= Molemo Moiloa =

South African artist and curator

- Born: 1987 (age 38–39); Johannesburg
- Education: University of the Witwatersrand
- Occupations: Curator; Artist

Molemo Moiloa (born 1987) is a South African lecturer, artist, researcher, and co-founder of Open Restitution Africa. A recipient of 2017 Vita Basadi Award. She was nominated alongside Nare Mokgotho for the 2016-2017 Vera List Center for Art and Politics.

== Education ==
Moiloa holds both bachelor's and master's degrees in social anthropology from the University of the Witwatersrand.

== Career ==
Moiloa explores the discussion of art and artefact restitution across the continent. A lecturer at the University of the Witwatersrand.

She co-founded MADEYOULOOK, a Johannesburg based interdisciplinary artist collaboration with Nare Mokgotho in 2009.

In 2020, Moiloa started a passion project Open Restitution Africa (ORA) along with her co-founder Chao Tayiana Maina.

== Fellowships and memberships ==
- Chevening Clore Fellow (2016–2017)
- DAAD Artists-in-Berlin fellows for visual arts (2022)
- Africa No Filter Fellow (2021)
- Documenta fifteen
- Soros Arts Fellow (2023)
