= State of Madras v. Champakam Dorairajan =

Supreme Court of India decision

- Court: Supreme Court of India
- Full case name: State of Madras v. Champakam Dorairajan
- Citation: AIR 1951 SC 226

Case history
- Subsequent action: Enactment of the First Amendment to the Constitution of India.

State of Madras v. Champakam Dorairajan (AIR 1951 SC 226) is a landmark decision of the Supreme Court of India. This judgement led to the First Amendment of the Constitution of India. It was the first major judgement regarding caste-based reservations in the Republic of India. In its ruling, the Supreme Court upheld the Madras High Court judgement, which in turn had struck down the Government Order (G.O) passed in 1927 in the Madras Presidency. The G.O had provided caste-based reservation in government jobs and college seats. The Supreme Court's verdict held that providing such reservations violated Article 29 (2) of the Indian Constitution.

Here, the court held that Directive Principles of State Policy must conform to and run as subsidiary to the Chapter of Fundamental Rights. The chapter on Fundamental Rights was sacrosanct, and DPSPs as in article 37 are expressly made unenforceable by a Court, hence, cannot override the provisions found in Part III which, notwithstanding other provisions, are expressly made enforceable by appropriate Writs, Orders or directions under article 32. DPSP can only be implemented as long as there is no infringement of Fundamental Rights under Part III, subject to limitations to legislative and executive powers provided under different parts of the Constitution. It was only in Minerva Mills case that a balance between Fundamental Rights and DPSP was sought.
