= Verena Krebs =

German historian

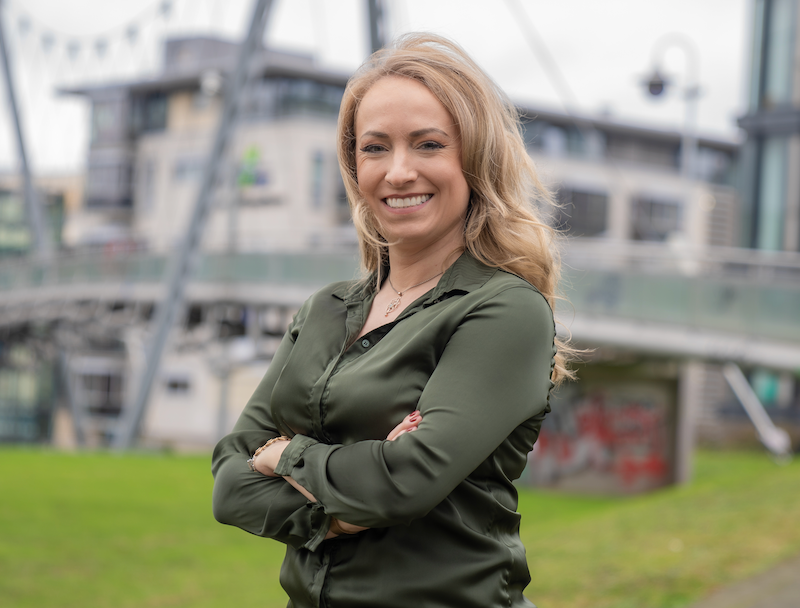
- Verena Krebs in 2022
- Occupation: Historian
- Awards: Dan David Prize 2022

Academic background
- Education: University of Konstanz; University of York; Mekelle University

Academic work
- Notable works: Medieval Ethiopian Kingship, Craft, and Diplomacy with Latin Europe

Verena Krebs FRHistS (born 1984 in Marburg) is a German historian who specialises in medieval European and African history. She was appointed a professor at the Historical Institute of the University of Bochum in 2017.

== Research ==
Krebs' first monograph, "Medieval Ethiopian Kingship, Craft, and Diplomacy with Latin Europe", received widespread attention upon its publication in 2021 and was very positively reviewed in both academic journals (including by Peter Brown and David Abulafia) and popular media (BBC History Podcast, Smithsonian Magazine, Al Jazeera China).

== Education and career ==
Krebs studied at the University of Konstanz and graduated with a Master of Arts in history in 2010. In 2014, she was awarded a bi-national doctorate in Medieval History by the University of Konstanz, Germany, and Mekelle University, Ethiopia, for her PhD research on the medieval history of Solomonic Ethiopia, citing Ethiopian historian Taddesse Tamrat as a significant influence on her research. She was a postdoctoral research fellow of the Martin Buber Society in the Humanities and Social Sciences at the Hebrew University of Jerusalem from 2014 to 2017 before being appointed to a non-permanent professorship (Juniorprofessur) at the University of Bochum in 2017. In July 2025, Krebs was appointed full professor for the "History of Medieval Cultural Realms and their Entanglements" at Bochum.

== Honours ==
Krebs was named a Fellow of the Royal Historical Society (FRHistS) in 2021. In March 2022, she was awarded the Dan David Prize, which "recognizes outstanding scholarship that illuminates the past and seeks to anchor public discourse in a deeper understanding of history" for "overturning traditional narratives of African-European relations and cultural exchange, and painting a vivid picture of the role of art, artisans and relics in state-building and diplomacy in medieval Ethiopia".

That same year, Krebs was awarded a Gerda Henkel Fellowship, which enabled her to spend the academic year 2022/23 as a Member of the School of Historical Studies at the Institute for Advanced Study at Princeton.

== Works (selection) ==
- "Medieval Ethiopian Kingship, Craft, and Diplomacy with Latin Europe", Palgrave Macmillian 2021. ISBN 978-3-030-64934-0
- "‘Ethiopia’ and the World, 330–1500 CE" (with Yonatan Binyam), Cambridge University Press 2024. ISBN 978-1-009-10796-9, doi:10.1017/9781009106115.
- "Windows onto the world: culture contact and western Christian art in Ethiopia, 1402–1543." PhD thesis, University of Konstanz: KOPS – The Institutional Repository of the University of Konstanz, 2014.
