= Muzamil Jaleel =

Indian journalist (born 1972)

- Born: 17 November 1972; Srinagar, Kashmir
- Occupation: Journalist
- Notable credit(s): In 2009 he won the prestigious Ramnath Goenka awards for reporting from Jammu and Kashmir in print. He was awarded for exposing the sex scandal in the valley through his fearless writings. Sanskriti Award for excellence in Indian journalism and literature Kurt Schork Award for international journalism.
- Title: Bureau chief of the Indian Express

Muzamil Jaleel (born 17 November 1972) is the deputy editor at the Indian Express based in New Delhi. He was a visiting scholar at the University of California Berkeley. On another fellowship, he worked in London for the Guardian, the Observer, and The Times newspapers. From sex scandal to the Amarnath land row in the recent past to major stories over the years, Muzamil is known for his investigative stories and exposés that have shaken up and even brought down governments in the state.

== Rewards and recognition ==
Muzamil won the Ramnath Goenka Award in 2009 April for his investigative articles on the sex scandal in the valley, which exposed a high-profile nexus between politicians, bureaucrats and flesh traders. Following the investigative articles in the Indian Express, people were out on the streets and there was mass agitation. Muzamil has won Ramnath Goenka Award (RNG) for Excellence in Journalism four times. He won his first RNG for 2007 (the award was given in 2009) for his Kashmir reportage, for year 2009 for his coverage of the last days of the Lankan government's war against the LTTE (on the spot category), in 2012 (Reporting on Politics and Government category) for detailing the innocuousness that became incriminating in SIMI arrests. He again received RNG award (Reporting on Politics and Government category) in 2017. Muzamil has also received a Sanskriti Award for excellence in Indian journalism and literature, as well as a Kurt Schork Award for International Journalism from Columbia University. In 2002, the Asian Human Rights Commission (AHRC) reported that Jaleel had been assaulted by the Indian police in the Kashmir Valley, while on his way home from work. In 2017, Muzamil won another Ramnath Goenka award for reporting on Kashmir.

== Recent work ==
- (2008) "A Kashmiri in America: The Lucky Shade of Brown". dispatches.
