= ME Group =

Vending machine operator

ME Group International plc
- Type: Public limited company
- Traded as: LSE: MEGP
- Industry: Vending
- Founded: 1946
- Headquarters: Epsom, Surrey, England
- Key people: Sir John Lewis (Chairman); Serge Crasnianski, (CEO)
- Revenue: ▲£315.4 million (2025)
- Operating income: ▲£78.1 million (2025)
- Net income: ▲£56.6 million (2025)
- Total assets: ▲£334.4 million (2025)
- Total equity: ▲£213.0 million (2025)
- Website: me-group.com

ME Group International plc, formerly Photo-Me International plc, (LSE: MEGP) based in Epsom, Surrey, is a vending machine operator. The company is listed on the London Stock Exchange and is a constituent of the FTSE 250 Index.

== History ==
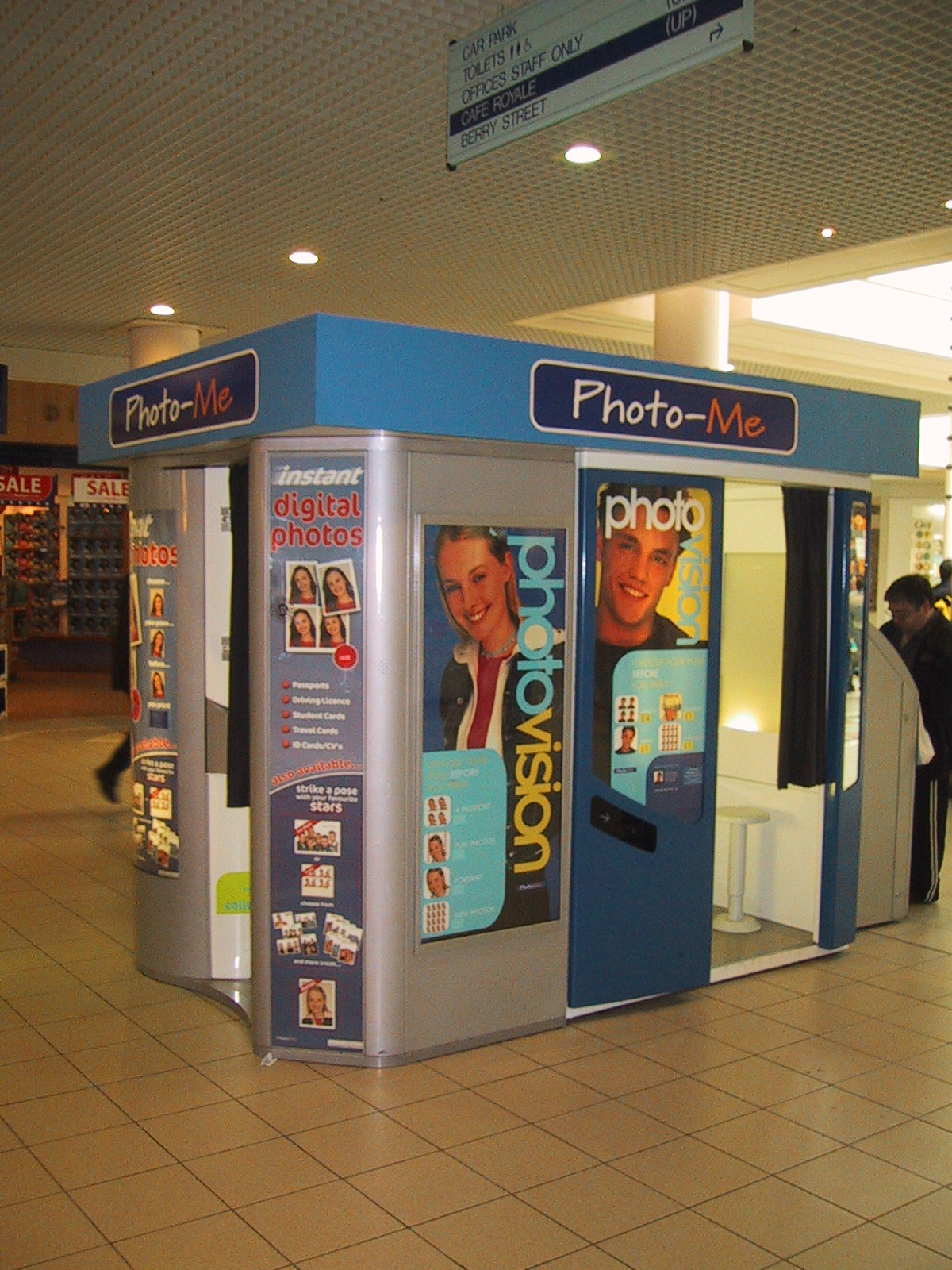
Photo-Me equipment in CastleCourt, Belfast, Northern Ireland

The company has its origins in a compact photograph developing process invented by Gupp Allen and Ignatius Dunlap Baker in California in 1946. They brought the process to the UK as a business named "Photo-Me" in 1952 and the company was first listed on the London Stock Exchange in 1962.

Serge Crasnianski became chief executive in 1998 and, under his leadership, the company saw a significant increase in its share price as investors were led to believe that photo booths would ultimately provide internet services on the go.

Three directors caused the company embarrassment in February 2007, when they cashed out their share options shortly before the company issued a profit warning: the Financial Services Authority subsequently fined the company £500,000 for not informing the markets in a timely manner. In September 2007, a shareholder revolt over plans to sell off the vending division forced Serge Crasnianski and Vernon Sankey to resign.

Serge Crasnianski was reappointed to the board as a non-executive director in May 2009. He was re-appointed chief executive in May 2010 and immediately implemented the disposal of the company's loss-making wholesale photo-processing labs business.

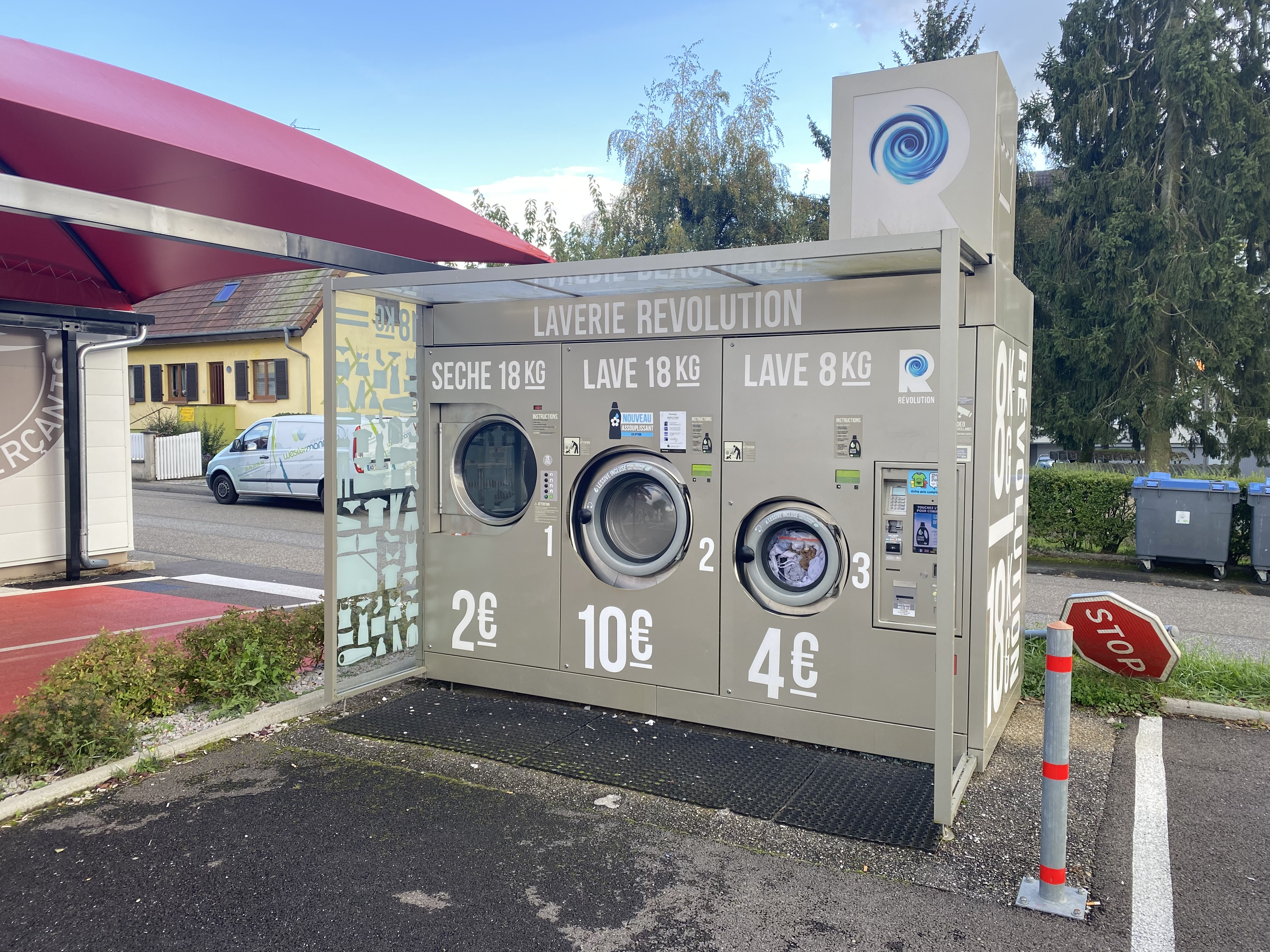
Revolution Laundry/Wash.ME self-service laundry

In November 2016, the company announced that the company had bought the photo division of Asda stores, taking over the supermarket's 191 photo centres and 172 self-service kiosks, and, in December 2019, the company diversified into the laundry business, with a division called "Revolution" providing 24/7 outdoor self-service launderettes.

The company was criticised in the satirical magazine, Private Eye, after it was disclosed that its chairman, John Lewis, had donated approximately £390,000 to the Conservative Party before being appointed a Knight Bachelor in the 2019 New Year Honours.

The company changed its name from Photo-Me to ME Group in August 2022 to reflect its reduced dependence on the photo booth business.
