= Return of 23 Namibian cultural belongings =

Return of cultural objects from Germany to Namibia

The return of 23 Namibian cultural belongings involved the transfer of historical objects from the Ethnological Museum of Berlin to Namibia in May 2022. The objects, including jewellery, tools and clothing, initially returned on an indefinite loan. Ownership was transferred to Namibia through an agreement signed in 2024. The belongings originated from various communities in Namibia, they were removed between 1860s and 1890s, a period encompassing German colonial rule in German South West Africa and its aftermath. The return formed part of ''Confronting Colonial Pasts, Envisioning Creative Futures'', a collaborative research project involving Namibian and German museum professionals. Ownership of the objects was formally transferred to Namibia in 2024.

== Background and selection ==
The collaboration developed following a 2017 visit to Berlin by Jeremy Silvester, then director of the Museums Association of Namibia. It became part of the project Confronting Colonial Pasts, Envisioning Creative Futures, involving Namibian and German museum professionals. Namibian heritage specialists participated in selecting 23 belongings from approximately 1,400 Namibian objects held by the Berlin museum. Selection considered cultural and historical significance, rarity, and suitability for transport. The wider project combined provenance research with collaboration involving Namibian heritage communities, researchers and contemporary artists.

== Return and transfer of ownership ==
The objects were handed over to the National Museum of Namibia in May 2022 after three years of discussions. The objects returned to Namibia in May 2022 under an indefinite loan arrangement. The loan designation prompted debate over the terms on which cultural belongings were being returned. In June 2022, the board of the Prussian Cultural Heritage Foundation authorised negotiations for the objects to remain permanently in Namibia. Before an exhibition opened in Windhoek in April 2024, Lars-Christian Koch, director of the Ethnological Museum of Berlin and Museum of Asian Art in Berlin, and Boyson Ngondo, a representative of Namibia's Ministry of Education, Arts and Culture, signed an agreement transferring ownership of the 23 objects to Namibia.

== Exhibition and community engagement ==
The exhibition Reconnecting with Returned Cultural Belongings opened at the National Art Gallery of Namibia on 11 April 2024. It presented the returned objects alongside contemporary works by Namibian artists, exploring their histories and relationships with communities in Namibia. The broader collaboration also supported museum training, conservation and documentation, and the development of the Museum of Namibian Fashion.
