= Serge Crasnianski =

French entrepreneur

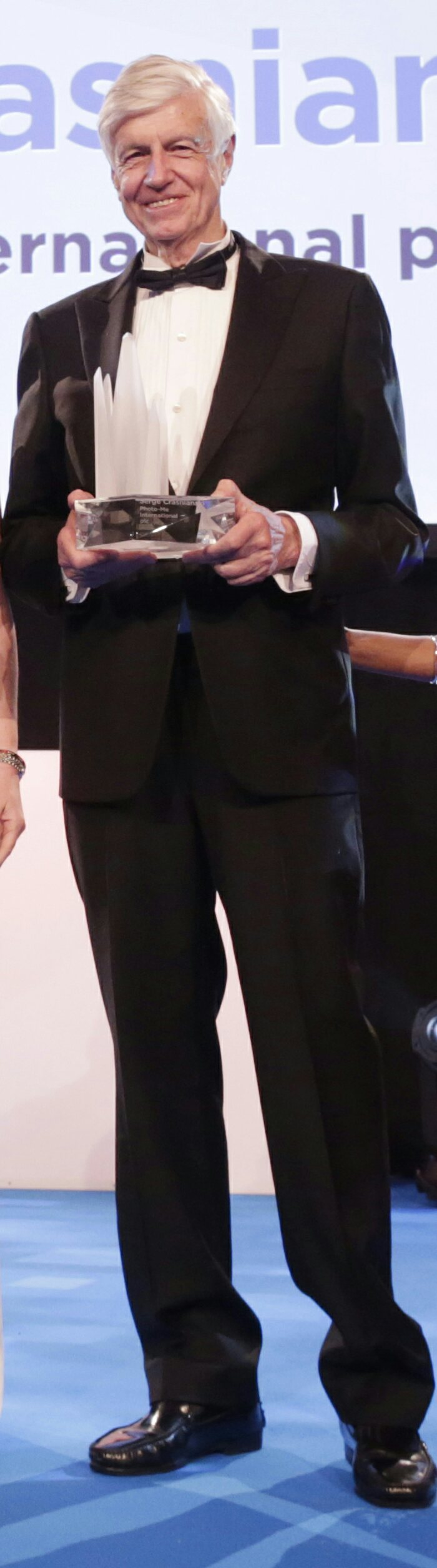
- Serge Crasnianski at PLC Awards 2016
- Born: 3 July 1942 (age 84)
- Engineering career
- Discipline: Inventor, Entrepreneur
- Projects: Kis, Solar

Serge Crasnianski (born 3 July 1942) is a French entrepreneur who founded the Grenoble-based Key Independent System (KIS) in 1963. This is the company that brought to the world the compact machine that cuts keys, prints business cards, engraves bracelets etc., and can be seen in thousands of corner hardware shops around the world.

KIS was formed as a result of Serge Crasnianski filing his first patent in 1963 for an automatic key machine – this was the first automatic machine to make keys. Since then, he has filed several hundred patents. The latest ones refer to the production and printing of organic and inorganic cells in a non vacuum environment.

After taking KIS worldwide he was bought out by Photo-Me International in 1994 (since re-named ME Group), and since then KIS has been Photo-Me's manufacturing business. He became a non-executive Director of PMI in 1990 and an executive director in 1994. He was CEO between 1998 and late 2007, when he was ousted from this position by a group of major shareholders following a decline in the profitability of the Group (it made a pre-tax loss of £6.3 million in the year to 30 April 2008)

He was reappointed to the Board as a Non-Executive Director in May 2009. He was subsequently appointed as Deputy Chairman and Joint Chief Executive, and in May 2010, he assumed the full role of Chief Executive.

Following his reappointment, a major restructuring was carried out at KIS, and the Group recorded a pre-tax profit of £1.6 million in the year ending 30 April 2009 before producing significantly improved results in the year to 30 April 2010. During this year, the Group’s loss-making wholesale photo-processing labs business was also sold. Pre-tax profits were £14.0 million, with a £31.6 million improvement in the overall cash position, meaning the net cash on the Balance Sheet was £8.1 million compared to net debt of £23.5 million the previous year.

Crasnianski remains the largest shareholder in Photo-Me International, with a holding of 22.11% as at 30 April 2010.

The company has diversified into the laundry business with a division called 'Revolution'. Revolution is a 24/7 outdoor self-service launderette. This division is trading beyond expectations, with 2000 units planned for the end of 2015.

Serge Crasnianski won the Entrepreneur of the Year Award at the PLC Awards 2016, sponsored by FinnCap.
