= Ramnath Goenka Excellence in Journalism Awards =

Indian award in journalism

- Awarded for: To recognise courage and commitment and showcase the outstanding contributions of journalists from across the country
- Country: India
- Presented by: Indian Express Group
- First award: 2006; 20 years ago
- Website: rngfoundation.com

The Ramnath Goenka Excellence in Journalism Awards (RNG Awards) are one of the awards in India in the field of journalism. Named after Ramnath Goenka, the awards have been held annually since 2006, with the 12th edition being held in 2017. The awards are given for both print journalism as well as broadcast journalism, with a total of 25 different prizes being awarded in 2017 for excellence in journalism during 2016.

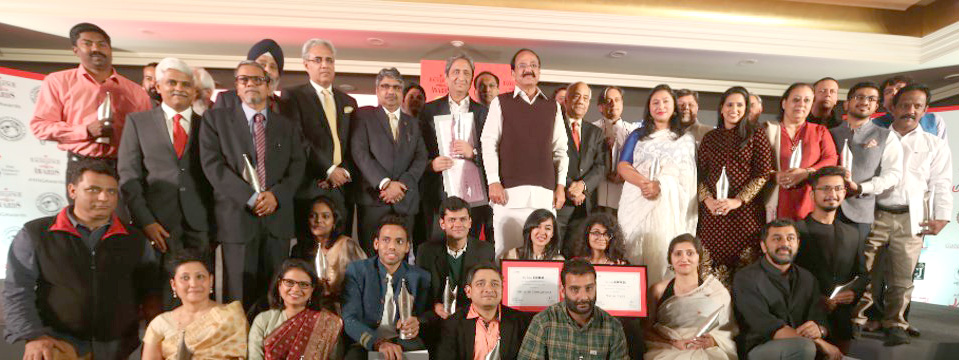
The 12th Ramnath Goenka Awards for Excellence in Journalism winners

Past winners have included Arnab Goswami (Times Now), Christophe Jaffrelot (The Caravan), Dionne Bunsha, Karan Thapar (CNN-News18), Kishalay Bhattacharjee, Kuldip Nayar, Mark Tully (BBC), Muzamil Jaleel (The Indian Express), Neelesh Mishra (Hindustan Times), Nidhi Razdan (NDTV), Rajdeep Sardesai, Ravish Kumar, Shashi Tharoor, Siddharth Varadarajan (The Hindu), Sudhir Chaudhary (Zee News), Sushil Mohapatra (NDTV), Umashankar Singh (NDTV), Vishnukant Tiwari (The Quint)among others. Foreign journalists to have won the award for Foreign Correspondent Covering India include Amelia Gentleman (The New York Times International Edition) and Stephanie Nolen (The Globe and Mail).

Ravish Kumar, Vishnukant Tiwari and Basant Kumar have each received the Ramnath Goenka Excellence in Journalism Award twice.

The Ramnath Goenka Memorial Debate, started in 2007, is also held during the event.

== Award categories ==
Over the years, the awards categories have changed. Awards can remain ungiven if there is no suitable winner, such as for the Ramnath Goenka Memorial Award For Lifetime Achievement In Journalism. The awards also have a cash prize, which over the years has also changed. Award categories during the 12th edition included:

=== Print ===
- Reporting From J&K And The Northeast
- Hindi
- Regional Languages
- Environmental Reporting
- Uncovering India Invisible
- Business & Economic Journalism
- Political Reporting
- Sports Journalism
- On The Spot Reporting
- Investigative Reporting
- Feature Writing
- Foreign Correspondent
- Commentary And Interpretative Writing
- Civic Journalist
- Photo Journalism

=== Broadcast ===
- Reporting From J&K And The Northeast
- Hindi
- Regional Languages
- Environmental Reporting
- Uncovering India Invisible
- Business & Economic Journalism
- Political Reporting
- Sports Journalism
- On The Spot Reporting
- Investigative Reporting

=== Past award categories ===
Past awards have included categories such as 'Excellence in HIV/AID Reporting Award', a joint initiative of Johns Hopkins Bloomberg School of Public Health, United States Agency for International Development (USAID) and Indian Express Group. Other past awards include 'Priya Chandrashekhar Memorial Award For Excellence In Editing' and the 'Prakash Kardaley Memorial Award For Civic Journalism'. In 2020, the 'conflict reporting' category was removed for the year.

== Full list of winners ==
=== Best Book (Non-Fiction) ===
- 2020 : Tripurdaman Singh (Sixteen Stormy Days)
- 2019 : Arun Mohan Sukumar (Midnight’s Machines: A Political History of Technology in India)
- 2018 : Gyan Prakash (Emergency Chronicles Indira Gandhi and Democracy's Turning Point)
- 2017 : Milan Vaishnav (When Crime Pays: Money and Muscle in Indian Politics)
- 2016 : Shashi Tharoor (Inglorious Empire)
- 2015 : Akshaya Mukul (Gita Press and The Making of Hindu India)
- 2014 : Ziauddin Sardar (Mecca : The Sacred City)
- 2013 : Gary J. Bass (The Blood Telegram: Nixon, Kissinger, and a Forgotten Genocide)
- 2012 : Cathy Scott-Clark
- 2011 : Mark Tully (Non-Stop India)
- 2010 : Mahmood Farooqui (Besieged: voices from Delhi 1857)
- 2009 : Wendy Doniger (The Hindus: An Alternative History)
- 2008 : Harish Damodaran (India's New Capitalists: Caste, Business and Industry in a Modern Nation)
- 2007 : Ramachandra Guha (India After Gandhi)
- 2006 : Dionne Bunsha

== Gallery ==
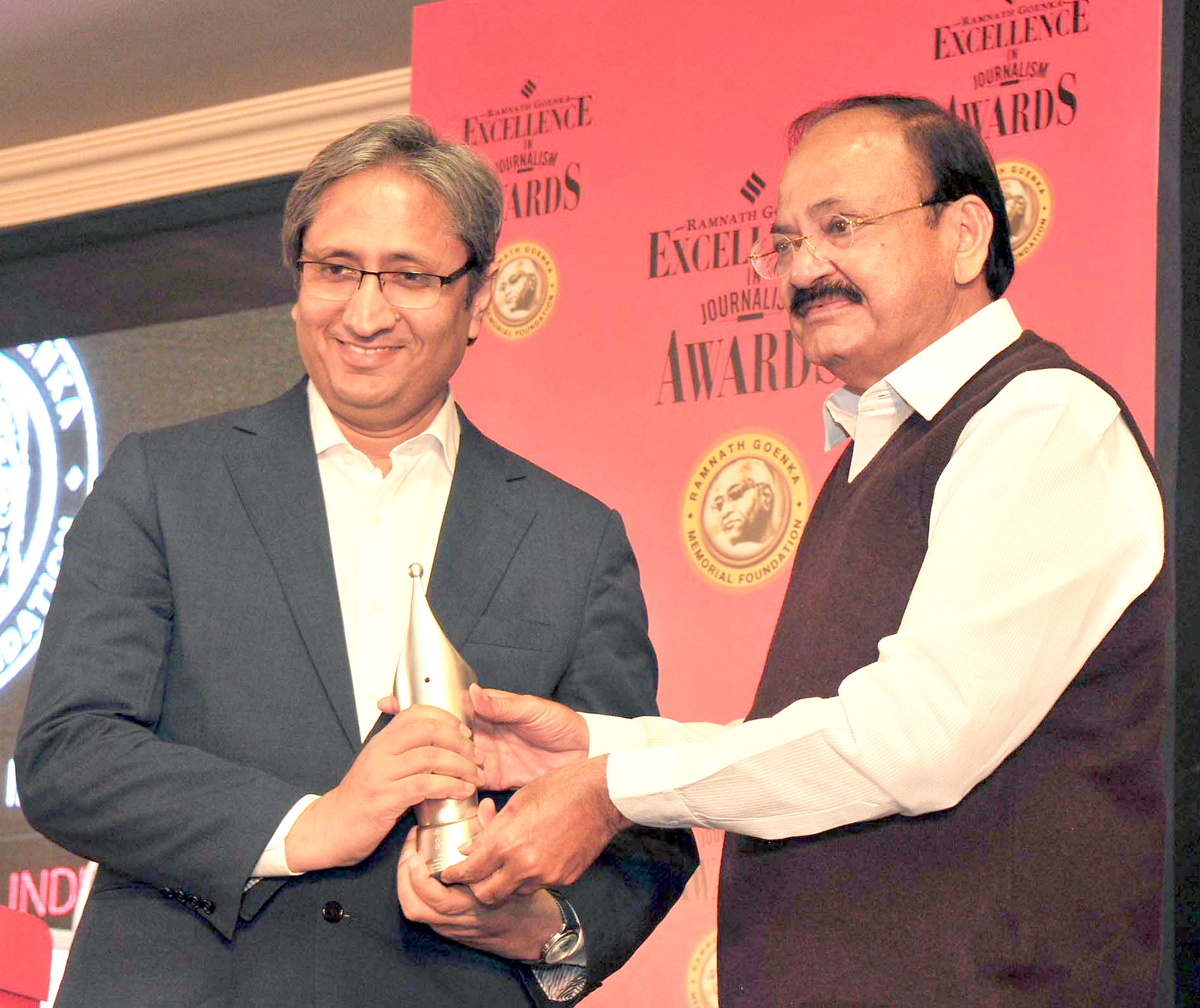

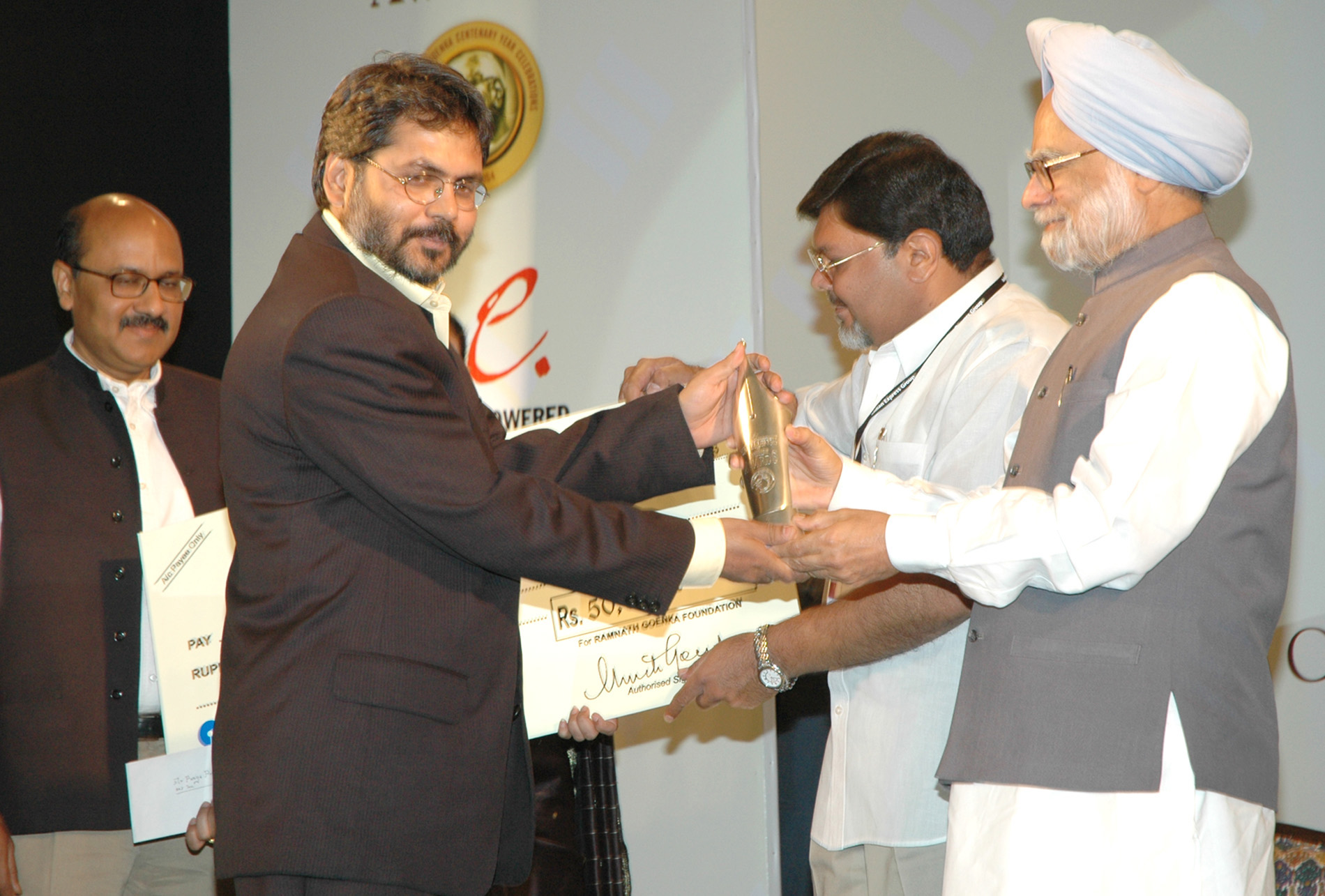

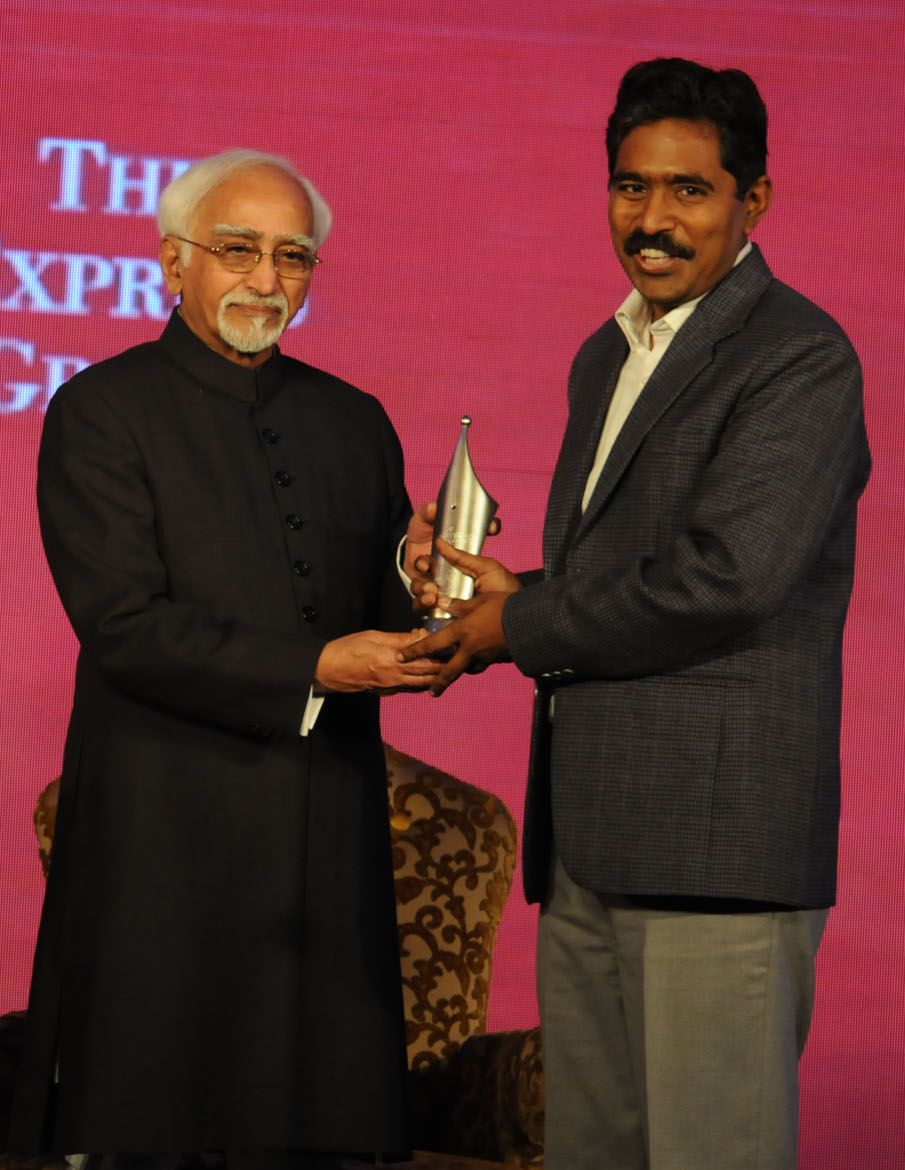

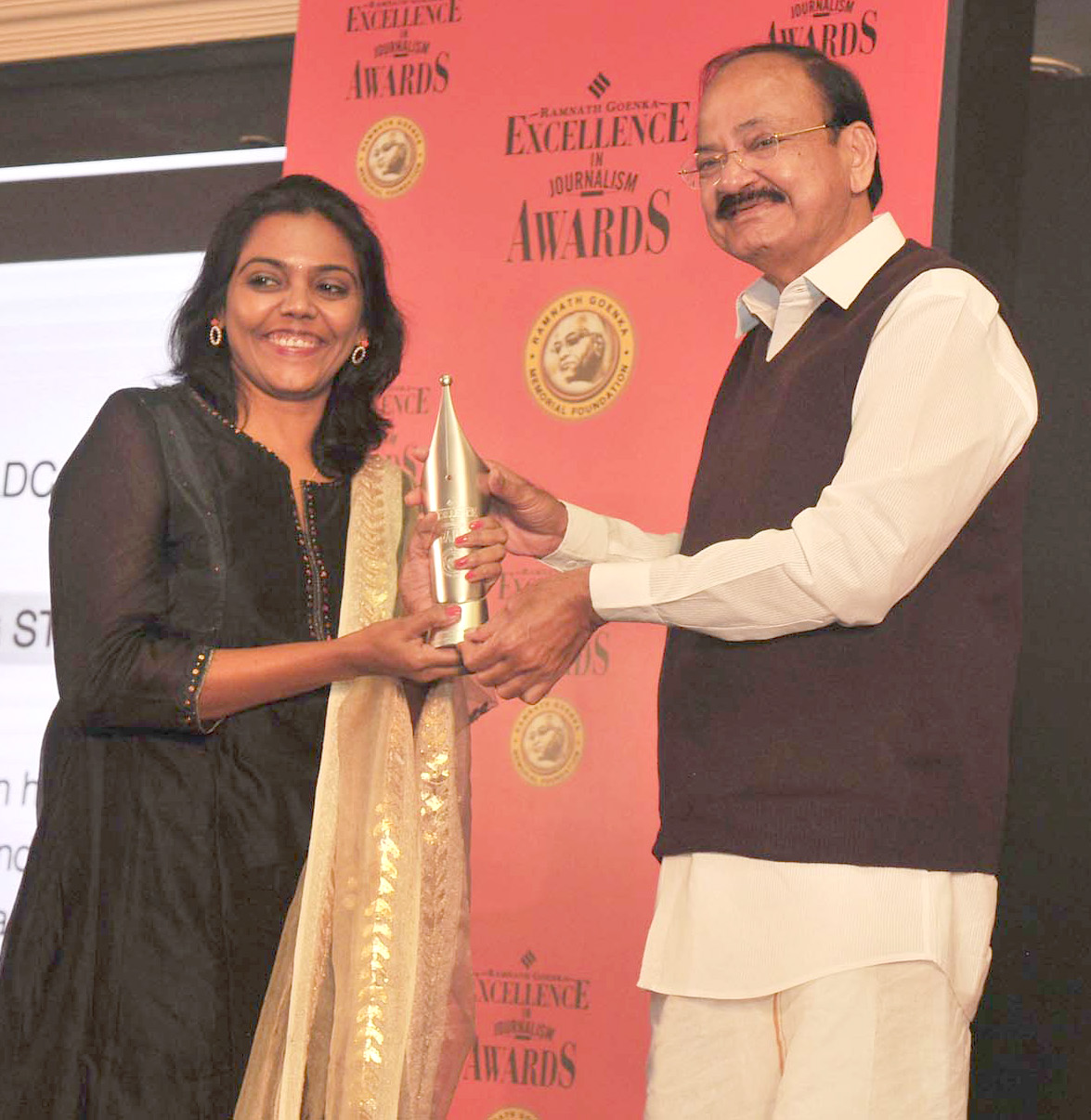

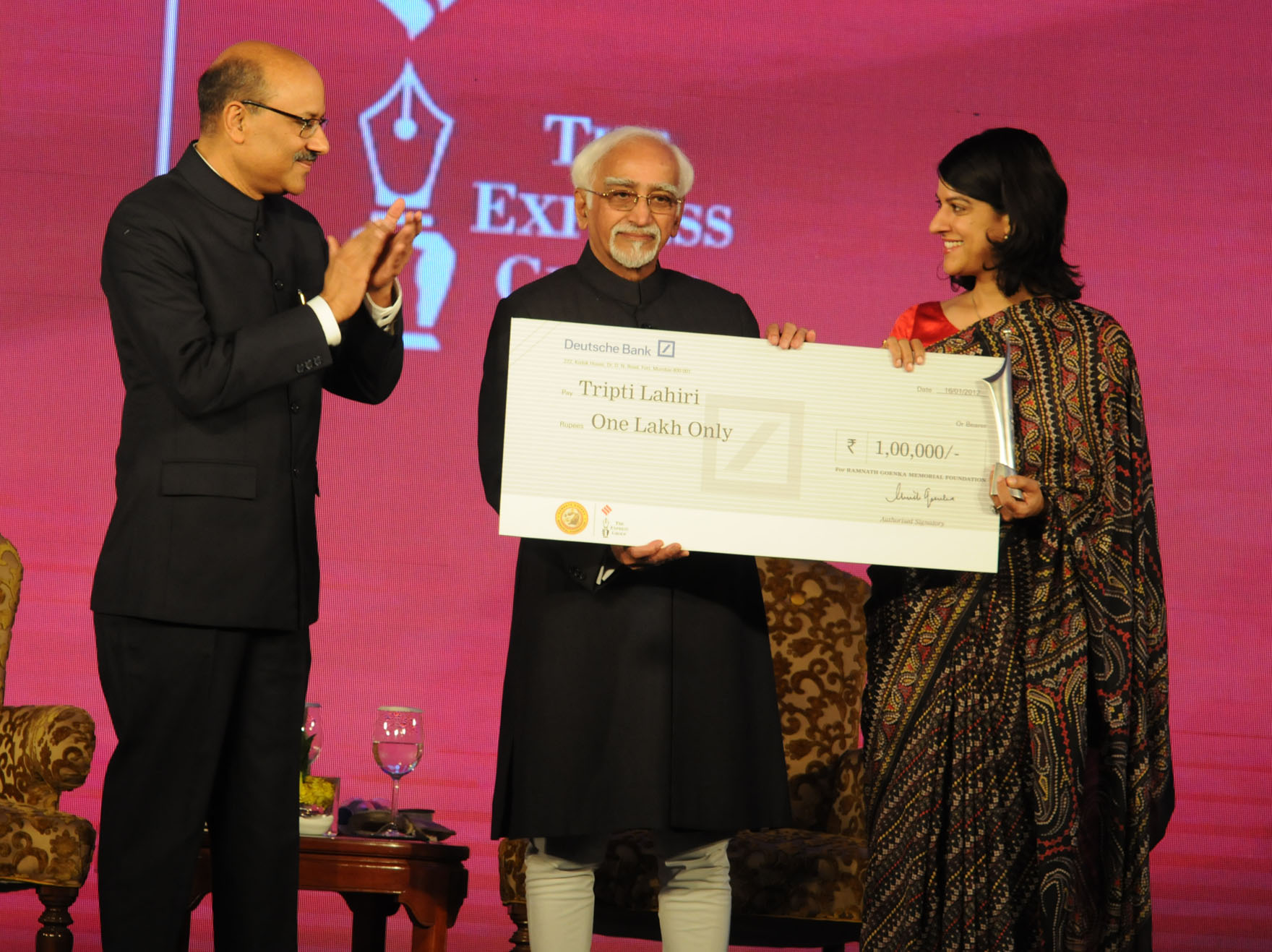

== See also ==
- Chameli Devi Jain Award for Outstanding Women Mediapersons
