= First Amendment of the Constitution of India =

1951 amendment to the Fundamental Rights

The Constitution (First Amendment) Act, 1951, enacted in 1951, made several changes to the Fundamental Rights provisions of the Indian constitution. It provided means to restrict freedom of speech and expression, validation of zamindari abolition laws, and clarified that the right to equality does not bar the enactment of laws which provide "special consideration" for weaker sections of society. It was moved by the then Prime Minister of India, Jawaharlal Nehru, on 10 May 1951 and enacted by Parliament on 18 June 1951.

This Amendment set the precedent of amending the Constitution to overcome judicial judgements impeding fulfilment of the government's perceived responsibilities to particular policies and programmes.

== Background ==
The Constitution of India became effective on 26 January 1950. Highlighting the features of the new Constitution, Times of India wrote "Laws inconsistent with the provisions of the part on fundamental rights shall to the extent of such inconsistency, be void". On 8 February 1950, just two weeks after the constitution was adopted, Bombay High Court delivered its judgement releasing communists who were indefinitely detained under Bombay Public Safety Measures Act. Patna High Court, on 14 February 1950, declared Bihar Maintenance of Public Order Act as "ultra vires".

In February 1950, Cross Roads magazine, published series of articles criticizing Madras government for a firing on communist prisoners in Salem Central Jail which left 22 prisoners dead. The Madras government responded on 1 March 1950, by banning circulation and distribution of the magazine in the province under the relevant sections of the Madras Maintenance of Public Order Act. In April 1950, Cross Road editor Romesh Thapar filed petition against this ban in Supreme Court.

At the same time, another publication Organiser, was also publishing against the policy adopted by government about Pakistan. On 2 March 1950, the Chief Commissioner of Delhi issued a "pre-censorship order" under the East Punjab Public Safety Act, requiring the editor and publisher to submit to the government for approval all communal matters and news about Pakistan. On 10 April 1950, Organiser filed petition in Supreme Court. The Supreme Court announced its verdict on both cases against Nehru government on 26 May 1950.

Nehru was allegedly frustrated by Article 19 because the ordinance that was declared by Madras was struck down by the Madras HC as ultra vires to Article 19(1)(a).

== Freedom of speech ==
In 1951, the Nehru administration made a provision limiting Article 19(1)(a) of Constitution of India against "abuse of freedom of speech and expression".

The need to control freedom of speech arrived in 1950 when the government came under severe criticism in the press about its response to the refugee influx in West Bengal and extra-judicial killings of communist activists in Madras. The administration censored the press, but the same was held unconstitutional by the Courts, forcing the government to look for new ways.

The government then used judicial judgements to justify the need to dilute freedom of speech. Some courts had held the citizen's right to freedom of speech and expression guaranteed by Article 19(1)(a) of the Constitution of India to be so comprehensive as not to render a person culpable even if he advocates murder and other crimes of violence. The Congress government noted that in other countries with written constitutions, freedom of speech and of the press is not regarded as debarring the State from punishing or preventing abuse of this freedom. The opposition disagreed, reminding parliament of First Amendment to the United States Constitution where State was barred from curbing fundamental freedom that formed the essence of democracy. Furthermore, it warned that restricting freedom of speech would lead to abuse by The State and drastically impact the democratic freedom of citizens. The majority government of Congress ignored the opposition's concerns.

== Freedom of trade ==
The right of citizens of India to practice any profession or to carry on any occupation, trade or business conferred by article 19(1)(g) is subject to reasonable restrictions which the laws of the State may impose "in the interests of the general public". While the words cited are comprehensive enough to cover any scheme of nationalization, it was thought desirable to place the matter beyond doubt by a clarificatory addition to article 19(6).

== Upholding land reforms ==
The Parliament of India noted that the validity of agrarian reform measures passed by the State Legislatures had, in spite of the provisions of clauses (4) and (6) of article 31, formed the subject-matter of dilatory litigation, as a result of which the implementation of these important measures, affecting large numbers of people, had been held up. Accordingly, a new article 31A was introduced to uphold such measures in the future. Further, another new article 31B, with retrospective effect, was introduced to validate 13 enactments relating to zamindari abolition.

== Equity ==
It is laid down in Article 46 as a Directive Principle of State Policy that the State should promote with special care the educational and economic interests of the weaker sections of the people and protect them from social injustice. In order that any special provision that the State may make for the educational, economic or social advancement of any backward class of citizens may not be challenged on the ground of being discriminatory, article 15(3) was suitably amplified.

=== Background ===
Jawaharlal Nehru encouraged the Parliament of India to pass the amendment in response to State of Madras v. Champakam Dorairajan, which went before the Madras High Court and then the Supreme Court of India. In that case, a Brahmin woman in Madras challenged the state's Communal General Order, which established caste quotas in government-supported medical and engineering schools, on the grounds that it denied her equality under the law; both courts had upheld her petition.

=== Debate ===
Syama Prasad Mookerjee opposed the amendment for curtailing freedom of speech expressly conceded that Parliament has the power to make the aforesaid amendment.

== Other amendments ==
Certain amendments in respect of articles dealing with the convening and proroguing of the sessions of Parliament were also incorporated in the Act. So also a few minor amendments in respect of articles 341, 342, 372, and 376.

== See also ==
- Sixteen Stormy Days, book written by historian Tripurdaman Singh on first amendment of constitution of India
