= Tangué =

Wooden decorated ship's beak

Tangué of Lock Priso Bell
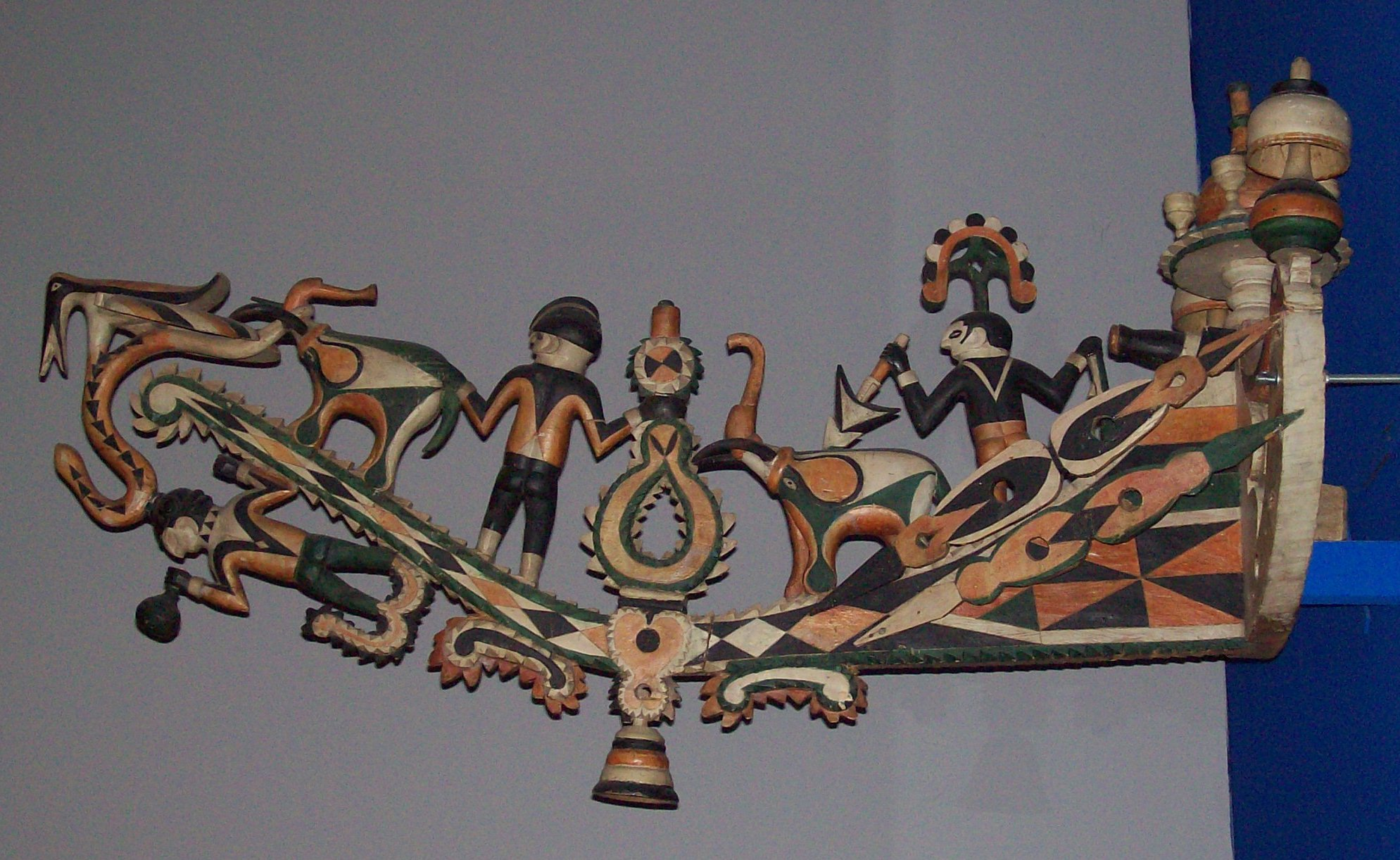
- The Tangué of the Bele Bele family
- Type: Sculpture
- Material: Wood
- Discovered: 1884
- Place: Douala
- Present location: Royal Ethnographic Collection (Museum Fünf Kontinente), Munich Germany
- Culture: Sawa People of Bonabéri (Hickory Town)

The Tangué is a personalised decorated ship’s beakhead, carved from wood and traditionally mounted on the ship belonging to the royal Bele-Bele family of the Douala region of Cameroon. This sacred and mystical object stood as a symbol of power and, in particular, the supreme authority of the king over the water tribes of the Douala Kingdom in Cameroon. Beyond its symbolic significance, the Tangué constitutes an important element of the kingdom’s socio-cultural and spiritual traditions. The Tangué of Lock Priso Bell was taken as a result of Max Buchner's punitive expedition against Lock Priso, chief of the Douala community of Hickory Town (now Bonabéri) and is currently housed in the Museum Fünf Kontinente in Munich since its capture by German troops in 1884.

== History and background ==
In the 1880s, kings and chiefs in Douala, along with leaders from other communities along the Bight of Biafra, strongly resisted attempts by the colonial rulers to occupy and control their territories. The British made an unsuccessful attempt to establish control, followed by the Germans, who eventually succeeded.

On 12 July 1884, the region was annexed by German troops after Germany convinced the kingdoms in the region to sign a protection treaty. However, only King Kum’a Mbappé, popularly known as Lock Priso, who was the head of the royal Bele Bele family, rulers of a kingdom in the region of Douala, refused to sign the treaty. He understood that the agreement would effectively strip his people of their ancestral lands and reduce them to being slaves under German colonial rule. His refusal to sign the treaty led to a violent German retaliation. In December 1884, German forces violently attacked and laid siege to Lock Priso’s palace. During the assault, they looted numerous sacred and culturally significant objects before setting the royal palace ablaze. It was during this devastating attack that the German colonial officer Max Buchner seized the Tangué, taking it from its original cultural and royal setting and handing it over to the Royal Ethnographic Collection (now known as Museum Fünf Kontinente) in Munich, Germany.

== Description ==
The Tangué is a large wooden sculpture, richly decorated with brightly painted geometric patterns and carved animal figures. Mounted on the prow of the boat, it features heraldic animals such as felines and snakes, alongside other motifs drawn from both local tradition and imperial symbolism. Model boats held in Western museum collections that bear a German flag at the stern date back to the German colonial period (1884–1914).

== Restitution efforts ==
Several early efforts were made to effect the restitution of the Tangué of Bele Bele to its rightful owners but those efforts proved abortive.

In 1961, Prince Kum’a Ndumbe III, grandson of Lock Priso, moved to Germany to further his studies. In 1981, during his period as an academic and writer in Germany, he came across three pieces or specimens of the Tangué on display at the Museum Fünf Kontinente. He immediately made contact with the staff at the Museum but his requests were immediately dismissed. Since then, he has been making constant efforts to recover the artifact that once belonged to his grandfather. This quest informed his decision to establish an organisation called AfricAvenir Foundation in Bonaberi, Cameroon, where the Bele-bele Kingdom is located. This foundation is tasked with ensuring that the Tangué is reclaimed and returned to its original home.

Initially, there were issues with determining if Prince Kum’a Ndumbe III was indeed an heir of Lock Priso. Uta Werlich, director of the Museum Fünf Kontinente noted that there wasn't enough proof to determine that Prince Kum’a Ndumbe III was the right person to reclaim the artifact as there was Paul Mbappe who was the official head of the Bele Bele family, appointed by the state of Cameroon. In 1998, after several years of constant efforts, Prince Kum’a Ndumbe III's quest finally registered a significant breakthrough as the authorities from Museum Fünf Kontinente finally acknowledged Prince Kum’a Ndumbe III as the heir to the Bele-Bele throne, and in turn the rightful claimant to the Tangué. Following this breakthrough, Prince Kum’a Ndumbe III entered into series of talks and negotiations with Museum Fünf Kontinente and German officials regarding the terms and conditions of the return of Tangué.

In May 2016, Museum Fünf Kontinente announced their intention to reopen negotiations concerning the return of the Tangué. However, it was Paul Mbappé – Paramount Chief of Bonaberi, where the Bele-Bele Kingdom is located, who was invited to represent the community in these discussions. It was a surprise as they had initially acknowledged Prince Kum’a Ndumbe III as the rightful claimant. These discussions were eventually stalled as the issue regarding the rightful claimant was raised again and it was obvious that the German authorities were taking advantage of the leadership dispute in the Duala communities.

Years later, in 2019, the Bele-Bele extended families, academics, students, journalists, chiefs and notables, government officials and other public and civil society organizations met in Cameroon to decide on who was the rightful claimant of the Tangué. They reached a decision that Prince Kum’a Ndumbe III was the rightful claimant since he was a direct descendant of Lock Priso. They gathered recordings of the meetings and sent them to the authorities at Museum Fünf Kontinente.

In 2022, the government of Cameroon led by President Paul Biya announced in a cabinet meeting that an inter-ministerial committee would be established in the Ministry of Culture to coordinate and finalise the restitution demands of various communities. The Interministerial Committee for the Repatriation of Cultural Property Illegally Exported Abroad was established to see to this. In 2023, key stakeholders paid a visit to German public and private museums to identify which museums had artifacts belonging to Cameroonian people. In 2024, negotiations continued between both countries.

== See also ==
- Douala
- Museum Fünf Kontinente
- Ethnologisches Museum
