= Vernon Sankey =

British businessman

Vernon Sankey is an Independent Director and Chairman of Audit Committee, Atos SE and a previous Chairman of Firmenich SA, Switzerland.

Sankey went to university at Oriel College, Oxford University. He is a Fellow of the Royal Society of Arts and was a Trustee of the Royal Charter.
