= List of National Historic Landmarks in Ohio =

Map of the landmarks

This is a list of National Historic Landmarks in Ohio and other landmarks of equivalent landmark status in the state. The United States' National Historic Landmark (NHL) program is operated under the auspices of the National Park Service, and recognizes structures, districts, objects, and similar resources according to a list of criteria of national significance. There are 76 NHLs in Ohio and four additional National Park Service-administered areas of primarily historic importance.

== Key ==
	National Historic Landmark
^{†}	National Historic Landmark District
^{#}	National Historic Site, National Historical Park, National Memorial, or National Monument
^{*}	Delisted Landmark

== Current National Historic Landmarks in Ohio ==
Ohio's National Historic Landmarks are distributed across 37 of the 88 counties in the state. With fourteen NHLs, Hamilton County in the southwest corner has more than any other county.

	Landmark name	Image	Date designated	Location	County	Description
1^{†}	Adena	Adena	February 27, 2003 (#70000515)	Chillicothe; 39°21′13″N 83°00′55″W	Ross	Mansion of Thomas Worthington
2	Baum-Taft House	Baum-Taft House	January 7, 1976 (#73001470)	Cincinnati; 39°06′09″N 84°30′12″W	Hamilton	Taft family home now an art museum; designated for landscape murals by African-American artist Robert S. Duncanson.
3	Beginning Point of the U.S. Public Land Survey	Beginning Point of the U.S. Public Land Survey	June 23, 1965 (#66000606)	East Liverpool, OH and Ohioville, PA; 40°38′26″N 80°31′10″W	Columbiana, OH and Beaver, PA	Marker of origin of Northwest Territories survey, on Pennsylvania border
4	Carew Tower-Netherland Plaza Hotel	Carew Tower-Netherland Plaza Hotel	April 19, 1994 (#82003578)	Cincinnati; 39°05′56″N 84°31′31″W	Hamilton	
5^{†}	Central Branch, National Home for Disabled Volunteer Soldiers	Central Branch, National Home for Disabled Volunteer Soldiers	October 16, 2012 (#03001412)	Dayton; 39°44′33″N 84°15′52″W	Montgomery	
6	Cincinnati Music Hall	Cincinnati Music Hall	December 2, 1974 (#70000496)	Cincinnati; 39°06′32″N 84°31′06″W	Hamilton	
7	Cincinnati Observatory	Cincinnati Observatory	December 9, 1997 (#80003043)	Cincinnati; 39°08′27″N 84°25′22″W	Hamilton	
8	Cincinnati Union Terminal	Cincinnati Union Terminal	May 5, 1977 (#72001018)	Cincinnati; 39°06′35″N 84°31′56″W	Hamilton	
9	Cincinnati Zoo Historic Structures	Cincinnati Zoo Historic Structures	February 27, 1987 (#87000905)	Cincinnati; 39°08′33″N 84°30′34″W	Hamilton	
10	Cleveland Arcade	Cleveland Arcade	May 15, 1975 (#73001408)	Cleveland; 41°29′59″N 81°41′27″W	Cuyahoga	
11	USS Cod (Submarine)	USS Cod (Submarine)	January 14, 1986 (#86000088)	Cleveland; 41°30′30″N 81°41′32″W	Cuyahoga	The USS Cod Submarine Memorial is a National Historic Landmark and is docked in Cleveland, Ohio.
12	Jay Cooke Home	Jay Cooke Home	November 13, 1966 (#66000620)	Gibraltar Island; 41°39′29″N 82°49′16″W	Ottawa	Summer home of financier Jay Cooke
13	Covington And Cincinnati Suspension Bridge	Covington And Cincinnati Suspension Bridge	May 15, 1975 (#75000786)	Cincinnati, OH and Covington, KY; 39°05′25″N 84°30′34″W	Hamilton, OH and Kenton, KY	John A. Roebling's suspension bridge here was dramatic new design. It set precedent for Brooklyn Bridge later.
14	Manasseh Cutler Hall, Ohio University	Manasseh Cutler Hall, Ohio University	December 21, 1965 (#66000604)	Athens; 39°19′27″N 82°06′02″W	Athens	
15	Donald B. (Towboat)	Donald B. (Towboat)	December 20, 1989 (#89002458)	Bellaire; 40°01′16″N 80°44′17″W	Belmont	The Donald B. was built in 1923 and is the only 1920s unchanged diesel sternwheel towboat left in the United States. It still operates towing barges in the Ohio River. After years of being located in Switzerland County, Indiana, its home port was moved to Bellaire, Ohio in 2012.
16	Paul Laurence Dunbar House	Paul Laurence Dunbar House	December 29, 1962 (#66000619)	Dayton; 39°45′27″N 84°13′07″W	Montgomery	Home of black poet Paul Laurence Dunbar
17	Thomas A. Edison Birthplace	Thomas A. Edison Birthplace	January 12, 1965 (#66000608)	Milan; 41°18′00″N 82°36′16″W	Erie	
18	Eldean Covered Bridge	Eldean Covered Bridge	December 23, 2016 (#100000868)	Troy; 40°04′40″N 84°13′00″W	Miami	Only one of twelve long truss bridges still intact. It is considered to be the most structurely intact.
19	Wilson Bruce Evans House	Wilson Bruce Evans House	December 9, 1997 (#80003143)	Oberlin; 41°17′20″N 82°12′59″W	Lorain	
20	Fallen Timbers Battlefield	Fallen Timbers Battlefield	October 9, 1960 (#66000616)	Maumee; 41°32′32″N 83°41′51″W	Lucas	
21	Fort Ancient	Fort Ancient	July 19, 1964 (#66000625)	Lebanon; 39°24′29″N 84°05′28″W	Warren	
22	Fort Meigs	Fort Meigs	August 4, 1969 (#69000151)	Perrysburg; 41°33′03″N 83°39′05″W	Wood	
23^{#}	James A. Garfield Home	James A. Garfield Home	January 28, 1964 (#66000613)	Mentor; 41°39′49″N 81°21′04″W	Lake	
24	Joshua R. Giddings Law Office	Joshua R. Giddings Law Office	May 30, 1974 (#74001396)	Jefferson; 41°44′18″N 80°45′47″W	Ashtabula	
25^{†}	Glendale Historic District	Glendale Historic District	May 5, 1977 (#76001447)	Glendale; 39°16′18″N 84°27′49″W	Hamilton	
26	U.S. Grant Boyhood Home	U.S. Grant Boyhood Home	February 4, 1985 (#76001374)	Georgetown; 38°51′57″N 83°54′08″W	Brown	
27^{†}	Greenhills Historic District	Greenhills Historic District	December 23, 2016 (#100000800)	Greenhills; 39°15′50″N 84°31′28″W	Hamilton	
28	Warren G. Harding Home	Warren G. Harding Home	June 23, 1965 (#66000618)	Marion; 40°35′11″N 83°07′18″W	Marion	
29	Hawthorn Hill	Hawthorn Hill	July 17, 1991 (#74001585)	Oakwood; 39°43′13″N 84°10′34″W	Montgomery	The Orville Wright mansion.
30	Hopeton Earthworks	Hopeton Earthworks	July 19, 1964 (#66000623)	Hopetown; 39°22′47″N 82°59′08″W	Ross	
31	Huffman Prairie Flying Field	Huffman Prairie Flying Field	June 21, 1990 (#71000640)	Fairborn; 39°48′12″N 84°03′57″W	Greene	
32	Johnson's Island Civil War Prison	Johnson's Island Civil War Prison	June 21, 1990 (#75001514)	Danbury; 41°29′42″N 82°44′12″W	Ottawa	
33	Charles F. Kettering House	Charles F. Kettering House	December 22, 1977 (#77001080)	Kettering; 39°41′33″N 84°11′34″W	Montgomery	
34	Kirtland Temple	Kirtland Temple	December 8, 1976 (#69000145)	Kirtland; 41°37′33″N 81°21′44″W	Lake	
35	John Mercer Langston House	John Mercer Langston House	May 15, 1975 (#75001464)	Oberlin; 41°17′30″N 82°12′31″W	Lorain	
36	Langstroth Cottage	Langstroth Cottage	December 21, 1981 (#76001378)	Oxford; 39°30′17″N 84°43′49″W	Butler	
37	Edward D. Libbey House	Edward D. Libbey House	May 4, 1983 (#83004379)	Toledo; 41°39′38″N 83°33′32″W	Lucas	
38	Benjamin Lundy House	Benjamin Lundy House	May 30, 1974 (#74001537)	Mt. Pleasant; 40°10′29″N 80°48′13″W	Jefferson	
39	MAJESTIC (Showboat)	MAJESTIC (Showboat)	December 20, 1989 (#80003085)	Cincinnati; 39°05′42″N 84°30′17″W	Hamilton	
40	May 4, 1970, Kent State Shootings Site	May 4, 1970, Kent State Shootings Site	December 23, 2016 (#100000879)	Kent; 41°09′00″N 81°20′36″W	Portage	Site of May 4, 1970, shootings of Vietnam War protesters by Ohio National Guardsmen that killed four.
41	William H. McGuffey Boyhood Home Site	William H. McGuffey Boyhood Home Site	May 23, 1966 (#66000617)	Coitsville Township; 41°06′57″N 80°33′31″W	Mahoning	
42	William H. McGuffey House	William H. McGuffey House	December 21, 1965 (#66000605)	Oxford; 39°30′26″N 84°44′10″W	Butler	
43	William McKinley Tomb	William McKinley Tomb	May 15, 1975 (#70000516)	Canton; 40°48′24″N 81°23′33″W	Stark	
44	Miami and Erie Canal Deep Cut	Miami and Erie Canal Deep Cut	January 29, 1964 (#66000603)	Spencerville; 40°41′15″N 84°21′55″W	Allen and Auglaize	Mile long segment of the Miami and Erie Canal cut as deep as 52 feet (16 m), in order to cut a trough through a blue clay ridge separating the St. Marys and Auglaize River watersheds
45^{†}	Mount Pleasant Historic District	Mount Pleasant Historic District	April 5, 2005 (#74001536)	Mt. Pleasant; 40°10′28″N 80°47′55″W	Jefferson	
46	Newark Earthworks	Newark Earthworks	July 19, 1964 (#66000614)	Heath and Newark; 40°02′32″N 82°25′48″W	Licking	
47	Oberlin College	Oberlin College	December 21, 1965 (#66000615)	Oberlin; 41°17′35″N 82°13′07″W	Lorain	
48^{†}	Ohio and Erie Canal	Ohio and Erie Canal	November 13, 1966 (#66000607)	Valley View; 41°22′14″N 81°36′59″W	Cuyahoga	A four mile (6 km) section of canal, including Tinkers Creek Aqueduct
49	Ohio Statehouse	Ohio Statehouse	December 22, 1977 (#72001011)	Columbus; 39°57′41″N 82°59′56″W	Franklin	
50	Ohio Theatre	Ohio Theatre	May 5, 1977 (#73001437)	Columbus; 39°57′37″N 82°59′57″W	Franklin	
51	John P. Parker House	John P. Parker House	February 18, 1997 (#97000340)	Ripley; 38°44′56″N 83°50′56″W	Brown	
52	George Hunt Pendleton House	George Hunt Pendleton House	January 29, 1964 (#66000611)	Cincinnati; 39°06′36″N 84°30′16″W	Hamilton	
53	Pennsylvania Railroad Depot and Baggage Room	Pennsylvania Railroad Depot and Baggage Room	June 17, 2011 (#76001536)	Dennison; 40°23′32″N 81°19′56″W	Tuscarawas	
54	People's Federal Savings and Loan Association	People's Federal Savings and Loan Association	December 22, 1977 (#72001042)	Sidney; 40°17′04″N 84°09′23″W	Shelby	Louis Sullivan-designed bank building
55	Plum Street Temple	Plum Street Temple	May 15, 1975 (#72001021)	Cincinnati; 39°06′14″N 84°31′07″W	Hamilton	
56	John Rankin House	John Rankin House	February 18, 1997 (#70000485)	Ripley; 38°45′04″N 83°50′32″W	Brown	Home of John Rankin, abolitionist.
57	Captain Edward V. Rickenbacker House	Captain Edward V. Rickenbacker House	May 11, 1976 (#76001426)	Columbus; 39°56′58″N 82°57′44″W	Franklin	
58	S. Bridge, National Road	S. Bridge, National Road	January 29, 1964 (#66000610)	Old Washington; 40°02′36″N 81°22′27″W	Guernsey	
59	Serpent Mound	Serpent Mound	July 19, 1964 (#66000602)	Locust Grove; 39°01′00″N 83°26′00″W	Adams	
60	Sherman Birthplace	Sherman Birthplace	January 29, 1964 (#66000609)	Lancaster; 39°42′49″N 82°36′04″W	Fairfield	
61	Dr. Bob's Home (Dr. Robert and Anne Smith House)	Dr. Bob's Home (Dr. Robert and Anne Smith House)	October 16, 2012 (#85003411)	Akron; 41°05′45″N 81°32′57″W	Summit	Birthplace of Alcoholics Anonymous, co-founded by Bob Smith (doctor)
62	Spacecraft Propulsion Research Facility (B-2)	Spacecraft Propulsion Research Facility (B-2)	October 3, 1985 (#85002802)	Sandusky; 41°21′55″N 82°41′01″W	Erie	the world's only facility capable of testing full-scale upper-stage launch vehicles and rocket engines under simulated high-altitude conditions.
63	Spiegel Grove (Rutherford B. Hayes Home)	Spiegel Grove (Rutherford B. Hayes Home)	January 29, 1964 (#66000624)	Fremont; 41°20′31″N 83°07′35″W	Sandusky	Estate of U.S. president Rutherford B. Hayes, now a presidential library and museum under The Hayes Presidential Center, Inc.
64^{†}	Spring Grove Cemetery	Spring Grove Cemetery	March 29, 2007 (#76001440)	Cincinnati; 39°09′53″N 84°31′23″W	Hamilton	
65	Stan Hywet Hall	Stan Hywet Hall	December 21, 1981 (#75002058)	Akron; 41°07′02″N 81°32′55″W	Summit	
66	Sunwatch Site	Sunwatch Site	June 21, 1990 (#75001500)	Dayton; 39°42′48″N 84°13′55″W	Montgomery	
67^{#}	Alphonso Taft Home (William Howard Taft Home)	Alphonso Taft Home (William Howard Taft Home)	January 29, 1964 (#66000612)	Cincinnati; 39°06′03″N 84°30′12″W	Hamilton	Birthplace and home until age 25 of U.S. President William Howard Taft
68	John B. Tytus House	John B. Tytus House	May 11, 1976 (#75001335)	Middletown; 39°30′47″N 84°24′30″W	Butler	
69	Harriet Taylor Upton House	Harriet Taylor Upton House	October 5, 1992 (#92001884)	Warren; 41°14′22″N 80°49′21″W	Trumbull	
70^{†}	Village of Mariemont	Village of Mariemont	March 29, 2007 (#07000431)	Mariemont; 39°08′35″N 84°22′51″W	Hamilton	
71	W.P. SNYDER, JR. (Towboat)	W.P. SNYDER, JR. (Towboat)	June 29, 1989 (#70000522)	Marietta; 39°25′06″N 81°27′48″W	Washington	
72	Wright Cycle Company And Wright Printing Shop	Wright Cycle Company And Wright Printing Shop	June 21, 1990 (#86000236)	Dayton; 39°45′20″N 84°12′43″W	Montgomery	
73	Wright Flyer III	Wright Flyer III	June 21, 1990 (#90001747)	Dayton; 39°43′33″N 84°12′07″W	Montgomery	1905 Wright Flyer III airplane
74	Colonel Charles Young House	Colonel Charles Young House	May 30, 1974 (#74001506)	Wilberforce; 39°42′26″N 83°53′25″W	Greene	Now the Charles Young Buffalo Soldiers National Monument.
75	Zero Gravity Research Facility	Zero Gravity Research Facility	October 3, 1985 (#85002801)	Cleveland; 41°24′37″N 81°51′51″W	Cuyahoga	vacuum chamber where drop tests are conducted to simulate low gravity conditions
76^{†}	Zoar Historic District	Zoar Historic District	October 31, 2016 (#16000859)	Zoar; 40°36′47″N 81°25′18″W	Tuscarawas	Only permanent home of the Society of Separatists in the United States.

== Historic areas of the National Park System in Ohio ==
National Historic Sites, National Historic Parks, National Memorials, and certain other areas listed in the National Park system are historic landmarks of national importance that are highly protected already, sometimes before the inauguration of the NHL program in 1960, and are then often not also named NHLs per se. There are seven of these in Ohio. The National Park Service lists these seven together with the NHLs in the state.

The James A. Garfield National Historic Site, the William Howard Taft National Historic Site, and the Charles Young Buffalo Soldiers National Monument are also designated as NHLs and are listed above. The remaining four are as follows.

	Landmark name	Image	Date established	Location	County	Description
1	Dayton Aviation Heritage National Historical Park		October 16, 1992	Dayton, Ohio		Includes the Huffman Prairie Flying Field, Wright Cycle Company building, 1905 Wright Flyer III, Paul Laurence Dunbar State Memorial, and Hawthorn Hill NHLs
2	First Ladies National Historic Site	The main entrance of the First Ladies National Historic Site	October 11, 2000	Canton	Stark	
3	Hopewell Culture National Historical Park		March 2, 1923	Chillicothe	Ross	
4	Perry's Victory and International Peace Memorial		June 2, 1936	Put-in-Bay	Ottawa	

== Former NHLs in Ohio ==
	Landmark name	Image	Date designated	Date withdrawn	Locality	County	Description
1	Hotel Breakers		March 9, 1987	August 7, 2001	Sandusky	Erie	Significantly altered in 1999.
2	Rocket Engine Test Facility		October 3, 1985	May 4, 2005	Cleveland	Cuyahoga	Demolished in 2003.
3	Benjamin F. Wade House		December 21, 1965	1968 or 1970	Jefferson	Ashtabula	Home of Civil War-era politician Benjamin F. Wade; demolished c. 1968.

== See also ==
- List of National Historic Landmarks by state
- National Register of Historic Places listings in Ohio
- List of National Natural Landmarks in Ohio
