= Rock Creek, Ohio =

- Village
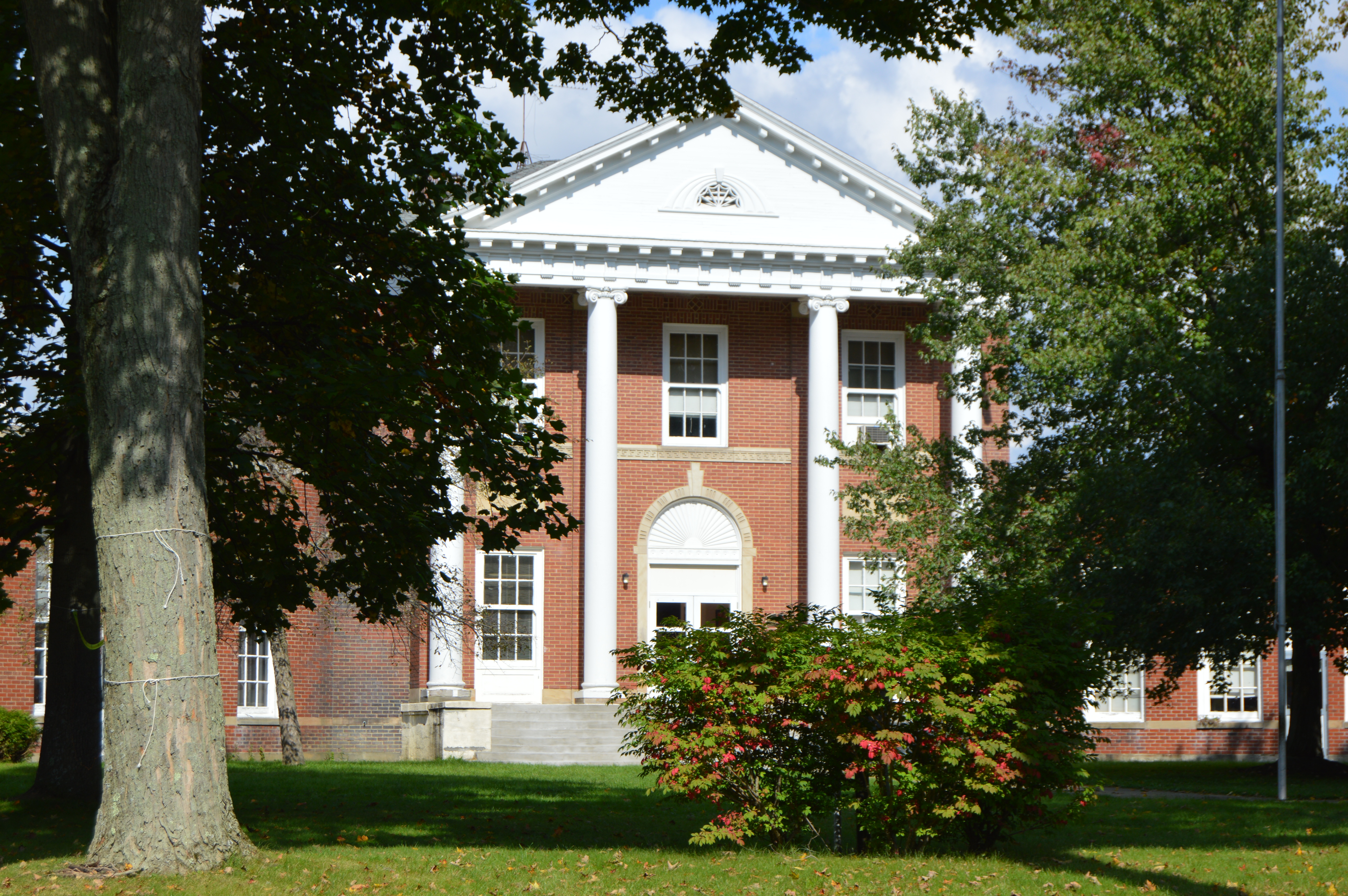
- Rock Creek School

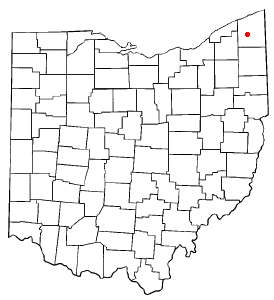
- Location of Rock Creek, Ohio

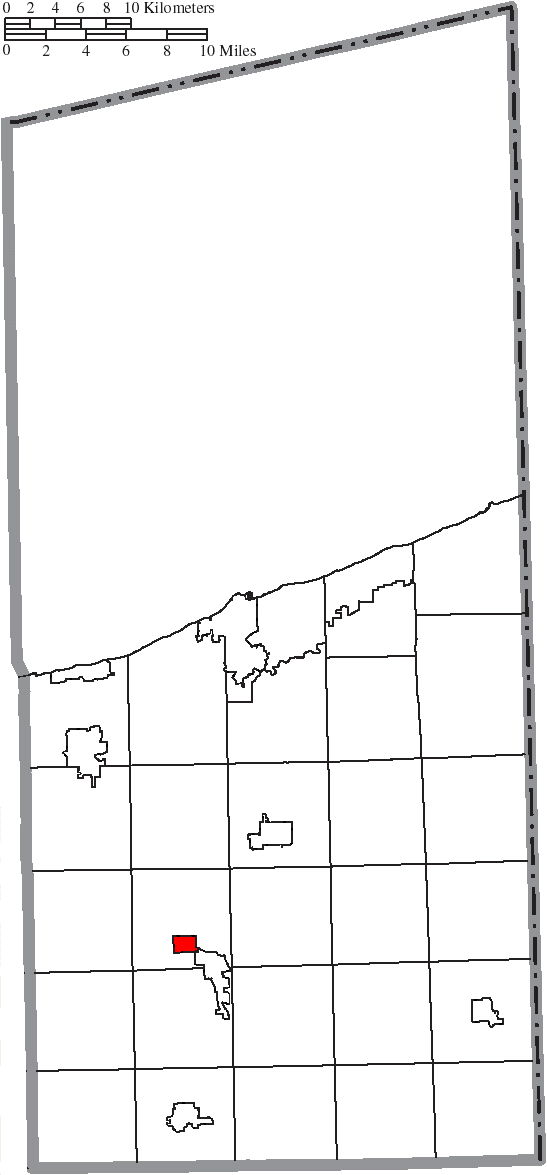
- Location of Rock Creek in Ashtabula County
- Coordinates: 41°39′37″N 80°51′38″W
- Country: United States
- State: Ohio
- County: Ashtabula
- Township: Morgan
- Incorporated: April 5, 1849

Area
  - Total: 0.89 sq mi (2.30 km^{2})
  - Land: 0.89 sq mi (2.30 km^{2})
  - Water: 0 sq mi (0.00 km^{2})
- Elevation: 804 ft (245 m)

Population (2020)
  - Total: 667
  - Density: 749.9/sq mi (289.55/km^{2})
- Time zone: UTC-5 (Eastern (EST))
  - Summer (DST): UTC-4 (EDT)
- ZIP code: 44084
- Area code: 440
- FIPS code: 39-67846
- GNIS feature ID: 1061619
- Website: www.rockcreekvillage.org

Rock Creek is a village in Morgan Township, Ashtabula County, Ohio, United States. The population was 667 at the 2020 census. It is part of the Ashtabula micropolitan area, 45 miles (72 km) northeast of Cleveland.

== History ==
The Village of Rock Creek was settled in 1798, organized in 1819, and incorporated as a village on April 5, 1849.

== Geography ==
Rock Creek is located at the confluence of Rock Creek and the Grand River.

According to the United States Census Bureau, the village has a total area of 0.89 square miles (2.31 km^{2}), all land.

== Demographics ==
Historical population
Census	Pop.	Note	%±
1860	443		—
1870	491		10.8%
1880	558		13.6%
1890	448		−19.7%
1900	478		6.7%
1910	455		−4.8%
1920	483		6.2%
1930	476		−1.4%
1940	492		3.4%
1950	604		22.8%
1960	673		11.4%
1970	731		8.6%
1980	652		−10.8%
1990	553		−15.2%
2000	584		5.6%
2010	529		−9.4%
2020	667		26.1%
U.S. Decennial Census

=== 2010 census ===
As of the census of 2010, there were 529 people, 196 households, and 137 families living in the village. The population density was 594.4 inhabitants per square mile (229.5/km^{2}). There were 218 housing units at an average density of 244.9 per square mile (94.6/km^{2}). The racial makeup of the village was 97.5% White, 1.5% African American, 0.2% Asian, and 0.8% from two or more races. Hispanic or Latino of any race were 0.2% of the population.

There were 196 households, of which 38.3% had children under the age of 18 living with them, 44.4% were married couples living together, 16.3% had a female householder with no husband present, 9.2% had a male householder with no wife present, and 30.1% were non-families. 23.0% of all households were made up of individuals, and 8.1% had someone living alone who was 65 years of age or older. The average household size was 2.70 and the average family size was 3.17.

The median age in the village was 36.8 years. 27.2% of residents were under the age of 18; 9.3% were between the ages of 18 and 24; 27.6% were from 25 to 44; 24.6% were from 45 to 64; and 11.3% were 65 years of age or older. The gender makeup of the village was 50.5% male and 49.5% female.

=== 2000 census ===
As of the census of 2000, there were 584 people, 195 households, and 146 families living in the village. The population density was 646.2 inhabitants per square mile (249.5/km^{2}). There were 201 housing units at an average density of 222.4 per square mile (85.9/km^{2}). The racial makeup of the village was 97.26% White, 1.71% African American, 0.17% Native American, and 0.86% from two or more races. Hispanic or Latino of any race were 0.17% of the population. 32.2% were of German, 14.5% Irish, 8.8% Italian, 7.7% American and 6.9% English ancestry according to Census 2000.

There were 195 households, out of which 40.0% had children under the age of 18 living with them, 59.5% were married couples living together, 10.8% had a female householder with no husband present, and 25.1% were non-families. 20.0% of all households were made up of individuals, and 10.8% had someone living alone who was 65 years of age or older. The average household size was 2.99 and the average family size was 3.43.

In the village, the population was spread out, with 32.5% under the age of 18, 8.0% from 18 to 24, 33.0% from 25 to 44, 17.5% from 45 to 64, and 8.9% who were 65 years of age or older. The median age was 32 years. For every 100 females there were 90.2 males. For every 100 females age 18 and over, there were 90.3 males.

The median income for a household in the village was $35,536, and the median income for a family was $37,917. Males had a median income of $28,125 versus $23,409 for females. The per capita income for the village was $13,276. About 7.9% of families and 9.6% of the population were below the poverty line, including 13.3% of those under age 18 and none of those age 65 or over.

== Education ==
Children in Rock Creek are served by the Jefferson Area Local School District. The current schools serving the village are:

- Rock Creek Elementary School – grades K-6
- Jefferson Area Junior High School – grades 7-8
- Jefferson Area High School – grades 9-12

== Notable people ==
- Lewis Sperry Chafer, theologian, founder of Dallas Theological Seminary
- Theodore Newcomb, American social psychologist, professor and author
