= Ashtabula County Courthouse Group =

Local government building in the United States

- U.S. National Register of Historic Places
- U.S. Historic district
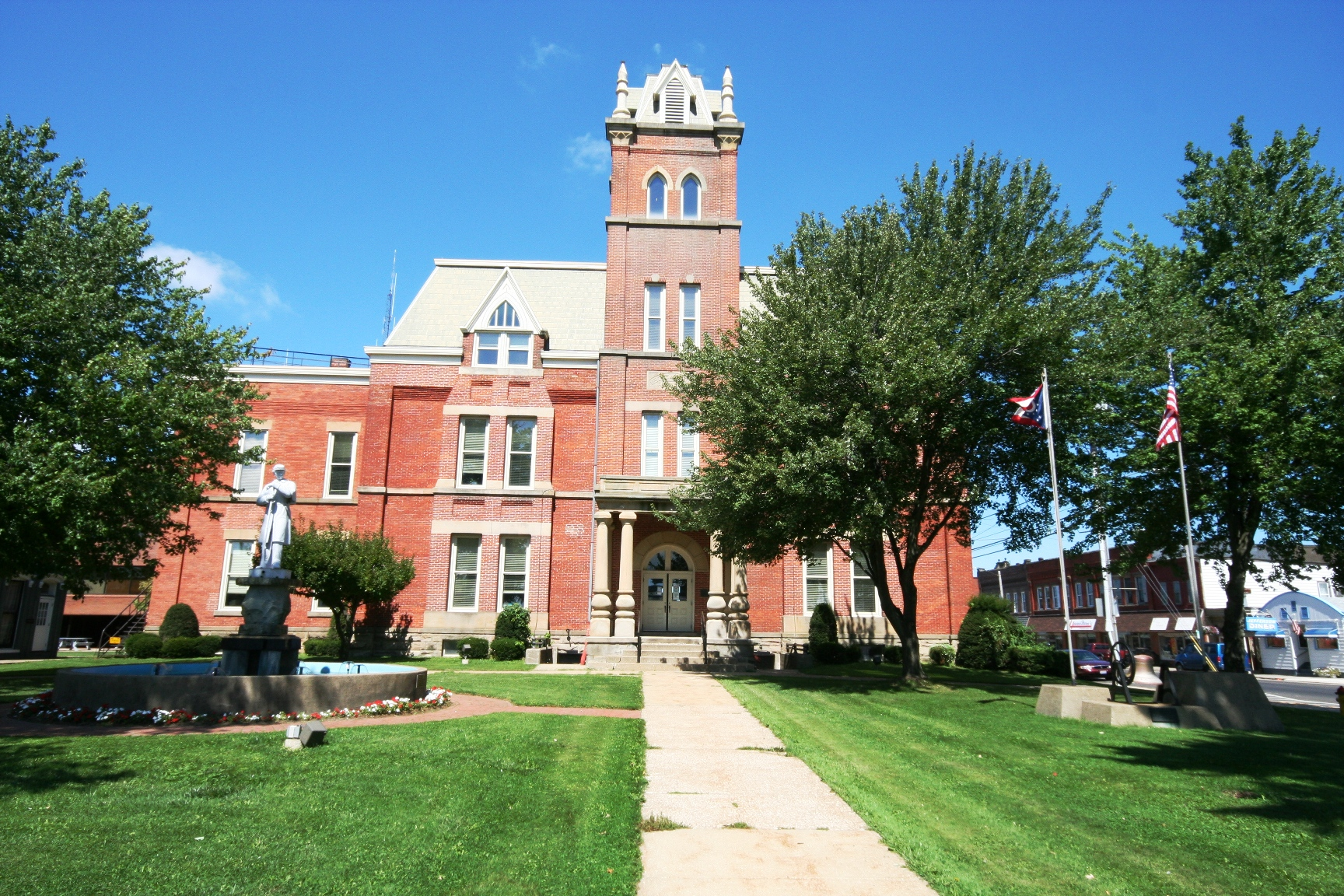
- Ashtabula County Courthouse

- Location within Ohio Location within the United States
- Location: Jefferson, Ohio
- Coordinates: 41°44′19″N 80°46′12″W
- Area: 10 acres (40,000 m^{2})
- Architectural style: Italianate and Queen Anne
- NRHP reference No.: 75001316
- Added to NRHP: June 30, 1975

Ashtabula County Courthouse Group is a registered historic district in Jefferson, Ohio, listed in the National Register in 1975.

== History ==
The Ashtabula County Courthouse Group is a cluster of buildings built at various times in the history of the county. The center of the district and the oldest building is the 1850 courthouse designed in the popular Italianate style so prevalent in the Victorian era. The courthouse was once the only building in this group, but the increasing population and confined spaces forced the county to develop the area into a judicial and administrative campus.

Ashtabula County was settled around 1796 and was part of the Connecticut Western Reserve of the Northwest Territory. The county was officially established by the Ohio General Assembly in 1807 with the county seat located in Jefferson. A courthouse was constructed around the same time and was completed in 1811. The building was two stories high and was a simple brick structure. This building lasted until 1836 when it was razed for the construction of a new courthouse.

The second courthouse was designed by architect Willis Smith from Kinsman. The structure is basically the same in appearance as the courthouse still standing. A fire burnt some of the structure in 1850 and it was rebuilt mostly true to the original design, although the dormers piercing the roofline were removed. It was around this time that the row house known as Lawyers Row was built.

The growing population soon demanded a more spacious courthouse and instead of demolishing the 1850 courthouse, a new one was built to house the probate court in 1870, while the county courts and administration remained in the old courthouse.

In 1960 the county was again faced with the challenge of providing more room for the county government. The county decided on building a new structure. This new courthouse is a glass and masonry building with a Justice Center addition built in the 1970s.

== Buildings ==
The district contains 4 contributing buildings:

=== Old Courthouse ===
The courthouse is located at the corner of North Chestnut and West Jefferson Streets and was completed in 1850. The building was built on the framework of an earlier courthouse from 1836 which was destroyed by a fire. The courthouse is designed in the Italianate style and is built with red brick and stone. Long rectangle windows with white trim dot the walls. The hipped roof contains several dormers for extra light to the top floor. A tower projects from the facade on Jefferson Street and houses the entrance framed by four columns with exaggerated bulbous bases. The tower is crowned with a decorative cap consisting of spires and a mansard roof. The courthouse once housed all of the county offices but after several additions the courthouse houses the county administrative offices. The County Commissioners now use old Probate Courtroom for an office and hearing room.

=== New Courthouse ===
An addition is located behind the courthouse and was built in 1960 by architects Kujala and Koski. The building is built with red brick with white window and door trim matching the original courthouse. This building is now considered as the official county courthouse.

=== Justice Center ===
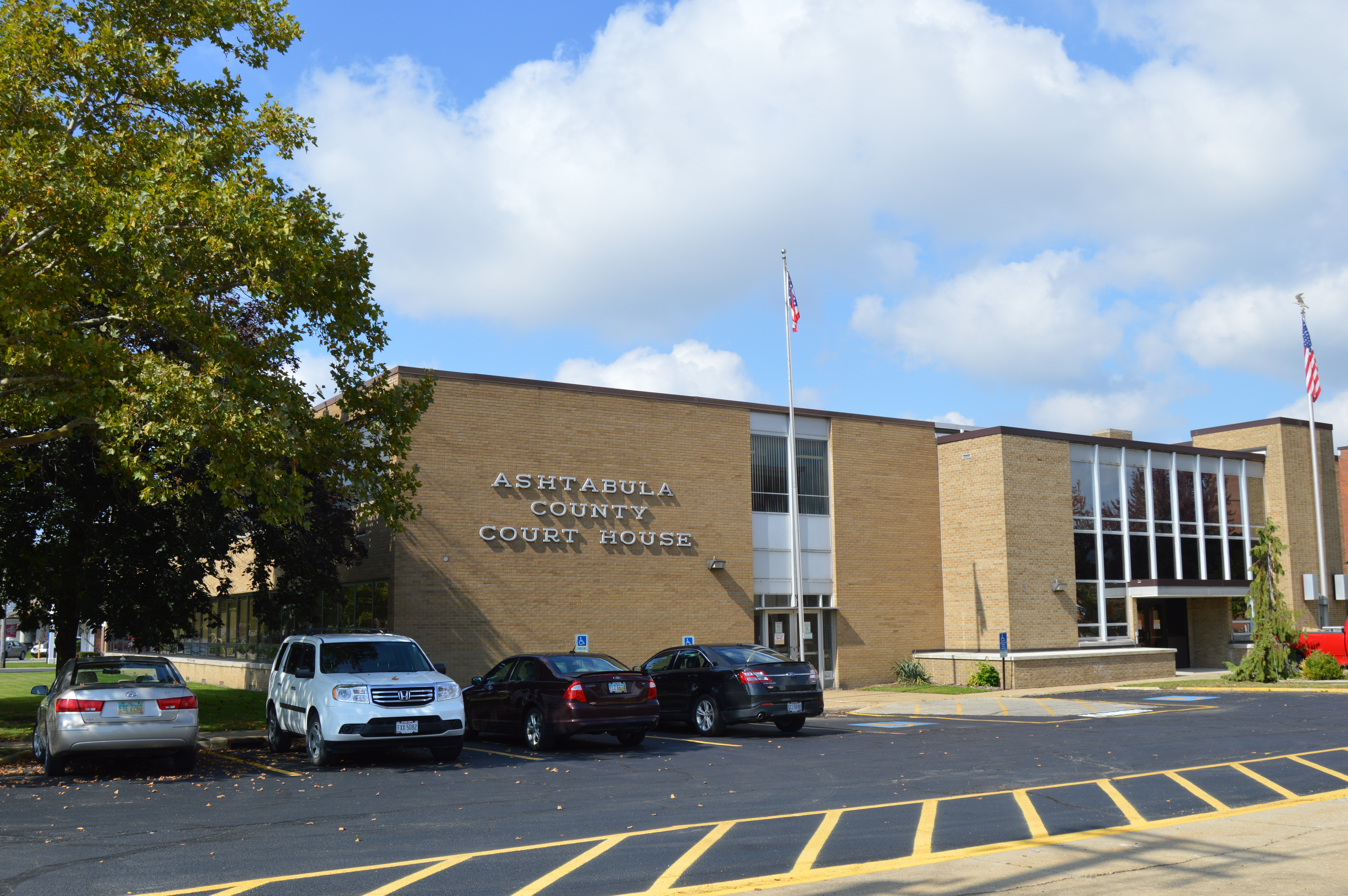
Justice Center

Around the same time the International style Justice Center was also constructed on the property. The Justice Center houses the police departments and sheriff offices. The building is also built with red brick with white door and window trim, with a projected entrance tower. The tower is three stories and is topped with an arched roof with large rectangular windows to illuminate the entrance bay below. Large glass walls connect the entrance projection to the rest of the building. The flat roof is hidden behind a solid balustrade.

=== Lawyers Row ===
A long building rests beside the old courthouse and divides the property in half. This building is known as Lawyers Row and resembles a train station. The building is white painted wood construction with large windows and deep overhanging eaves with brackets. A "boardwalk" spans the entire length of the building connecting the offices together.

== Historic uses ==
- Professional
- Courthouse

== See also ==
- Benjamin Wade
