= Jefferson Area Local School District =

Jefferson Area High School

Location
- 121 S Polar St. Jefferson, Ohio, Ashtabula 44047; United States

Information
- School type: Public, Coeducational
- NCES District ID: 3904587
- Superintendent: Mr. Jeremy Huber
- Teaching staff: 88.65 (FTE)
- Grades: K-12
- Enrollment: 1,985 (2024–25)
- Student to teacher ratio: 19.01
- Color
- Mascot: Falcon
- Website: http://www.jalsd.org

The Jefferson Area Local School District is a school district located in Jefferson, Ohio. The school district serves one high school, one junior high school, and two elementary schools.

== History ==
The Jefferson Area Local School District formed in the mid-20th century, following the consolidation of several small one-room schools in Jefferson, Rock Creek and Roaming Shores. Jefferson Area High School was built shortly after in 1962.

New buildings were opened in 2008/2009 to modernize the district's facilities.

Mr. Jeremy Huber is the current superintendent.

== Schools ==
Schools within the district includes:

=== High School ===
- Jefferson Area High School

=== Middle School ===
- Jefferson Area Junior High School

=== Elementary School ===
- Jefferson Elementary School
- Rock Creek Elementary School
