= Benjamin F. Wade House =

United States historic place (demolished)

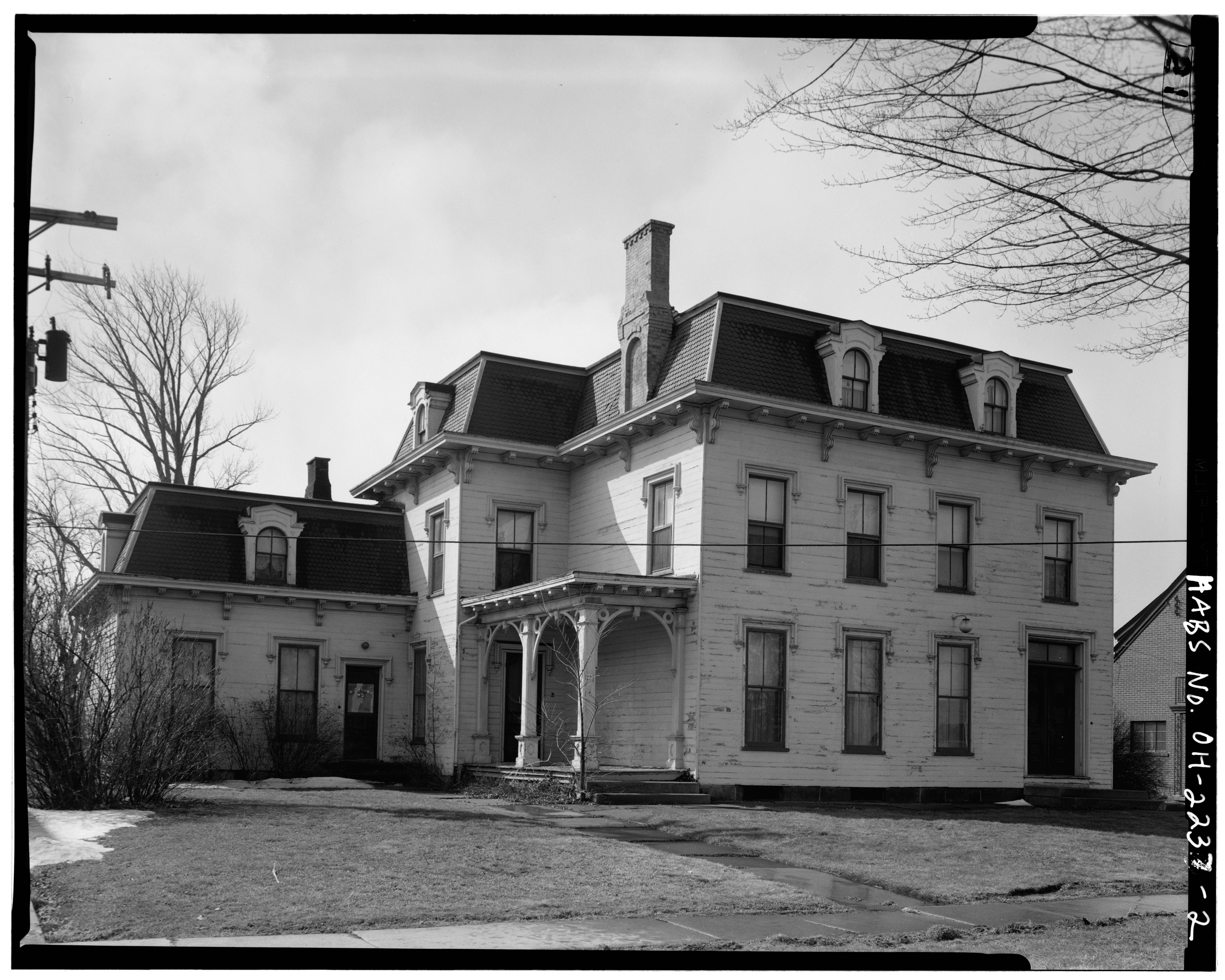
- Benjamin F. Wade House, a few months before its destruction in 1968.

- Location within Ohio Location within the United States
- 41°44′19″N 80°46′08″W
- Location: Benjamin Wade House, 22 Jefferson Street, Jefferson, Ohio

Site notes
- Architectural style: Clapboard
- Governing body: Private

Benjamin F. Wade House was the home of Civil War-era politician Benjamin Wade. Before its demolition in 1968, it was located at Jefferson, Ashtabula County in Ohio.

== History ==
The house was likely dated from the time of the Civil War, was a two-story clapboard structure with a mansard roof. It was the residence of US senator and abolitionist Benjamin Franklin Wade. Later in the 20th century, it was owned by Jefferson Savings and Loan Company. The house was demolished in the summer of 1968 and its lot was later used as a parking for the company.

The house was designated a National Historic Landmark in 1965 but withdrawn somewhere between 1968 and 1970 for no longer meeting the criteria after being demolished.

== Gallery ==
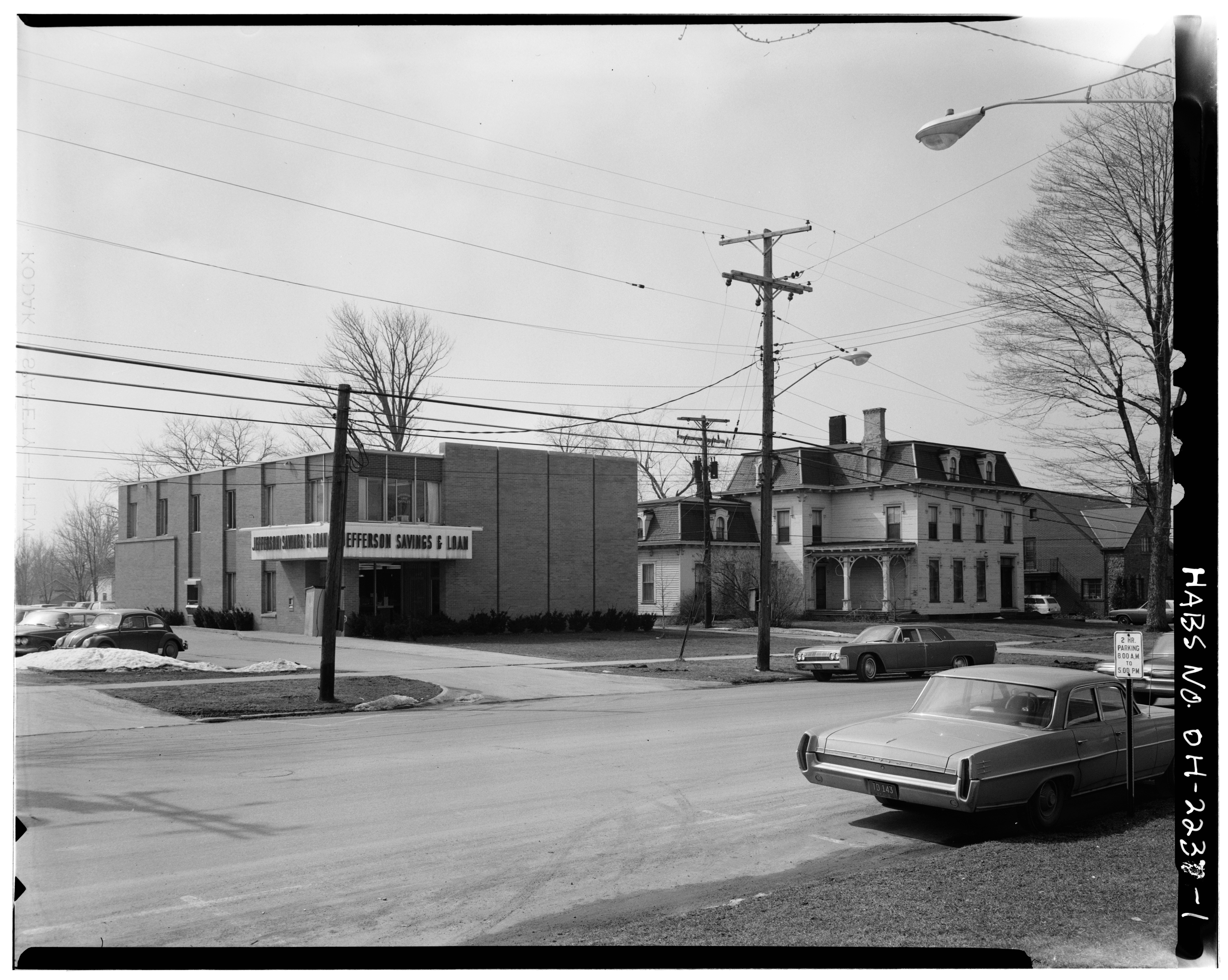
General view from North-east

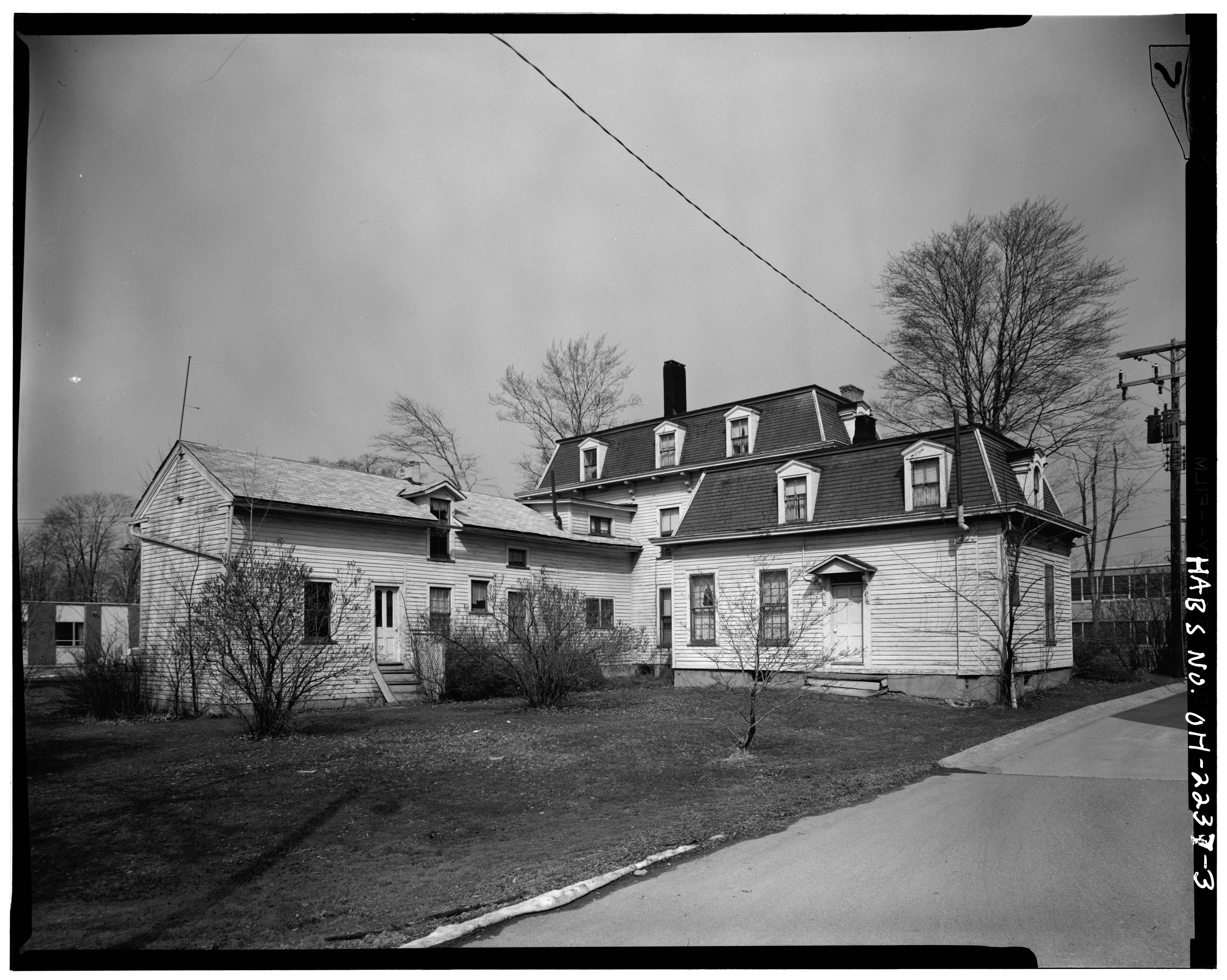
View from Southeast corner

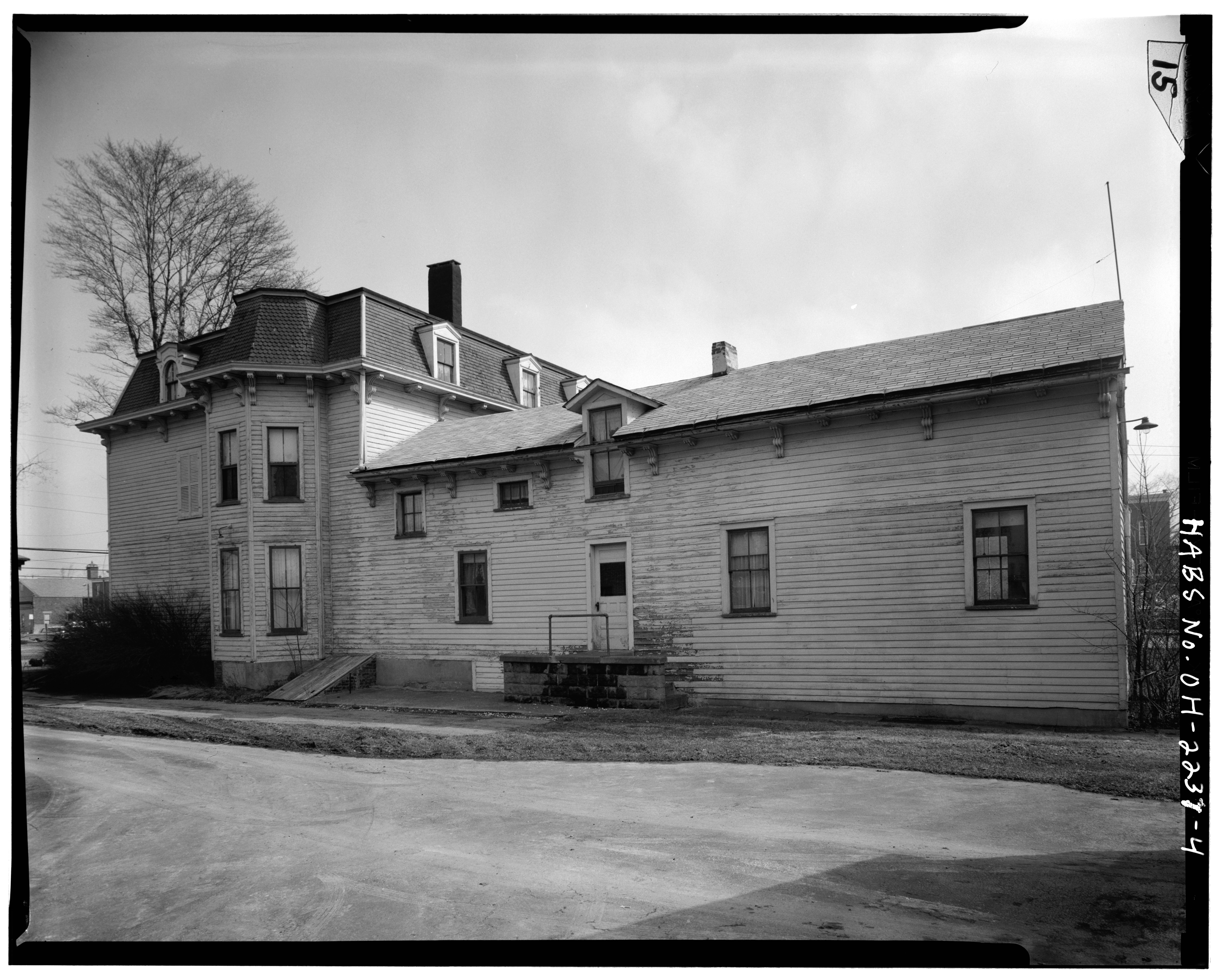
Southwest view

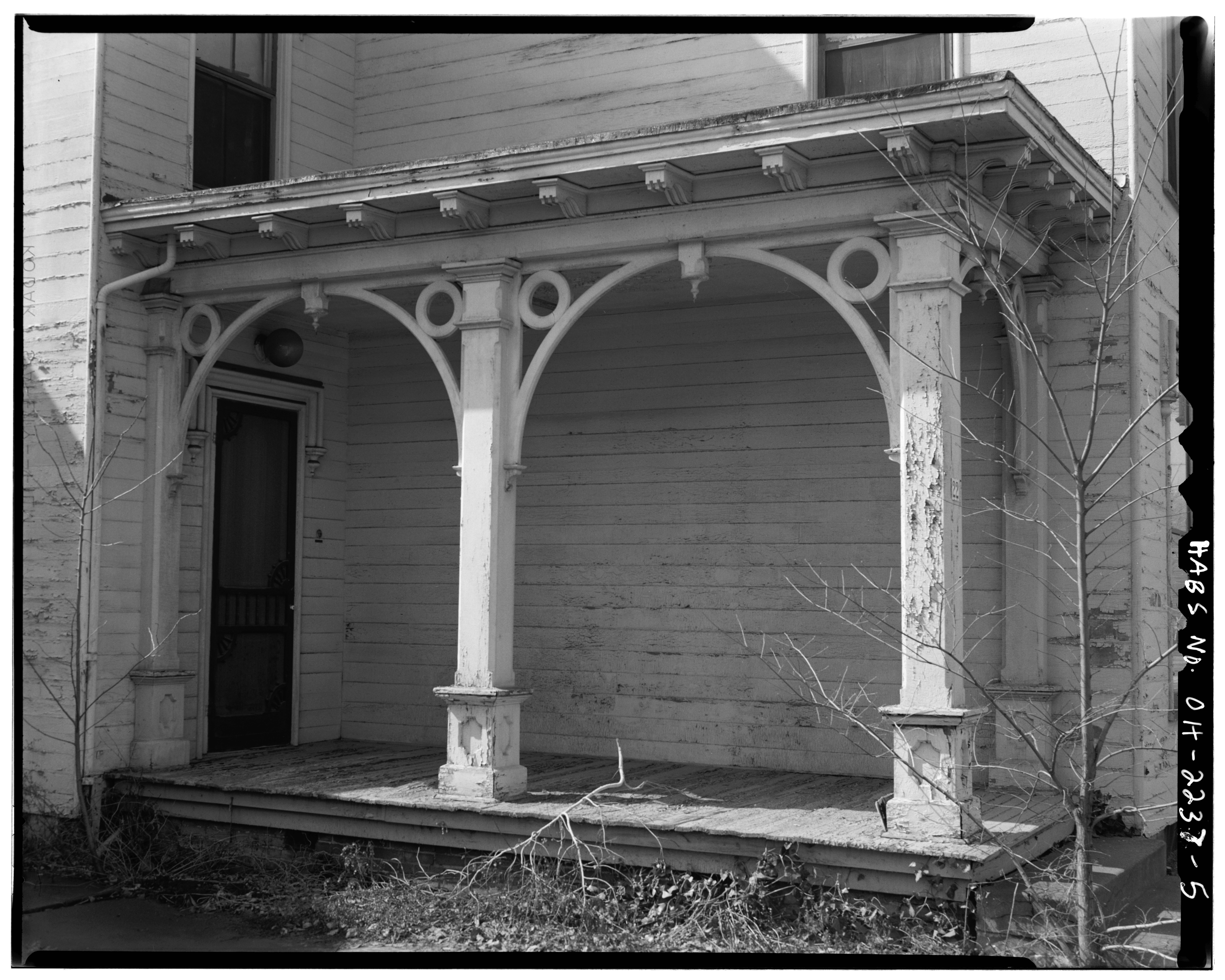
Porch detail

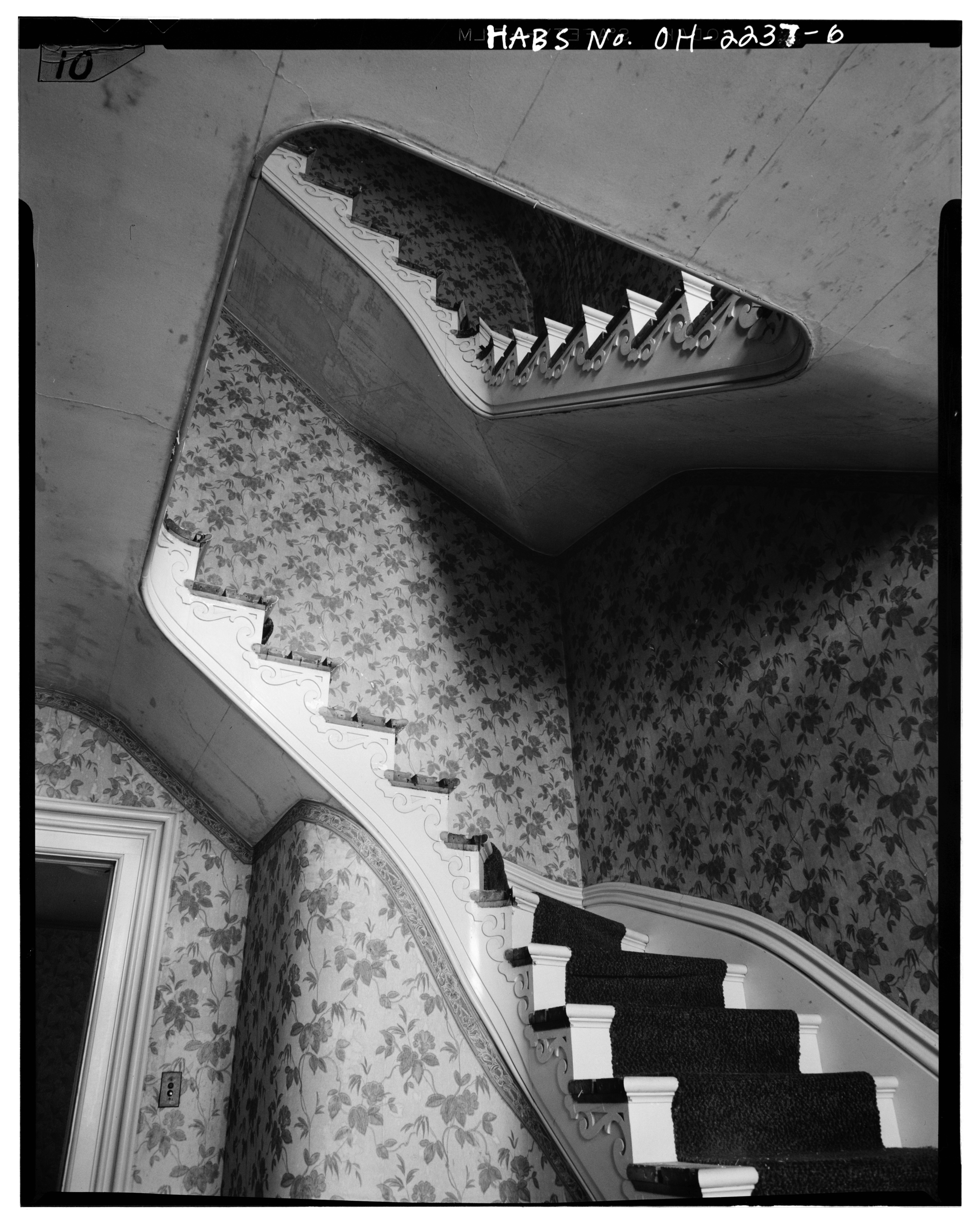
Stairway (interior)

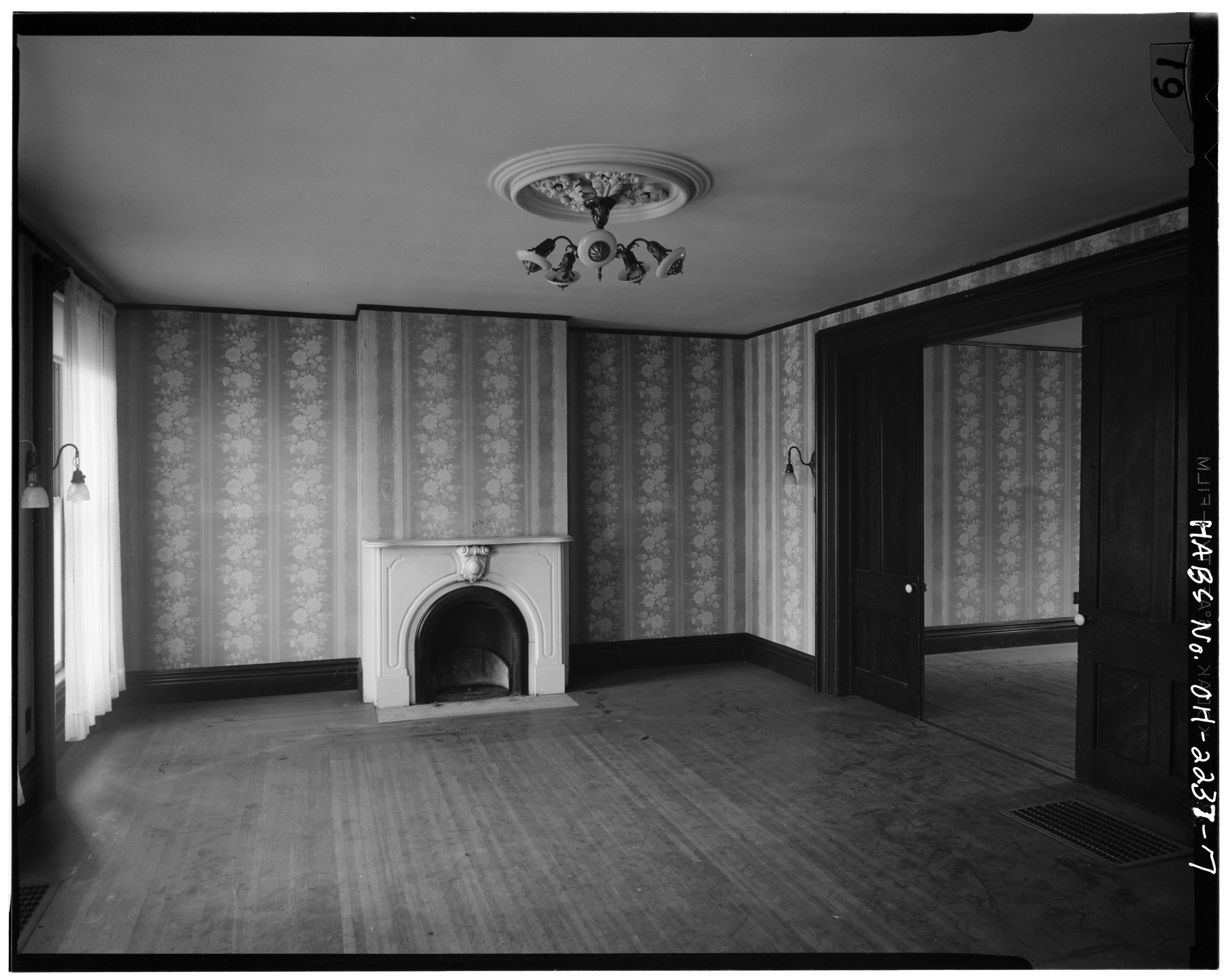
Living room (interior)
