= John Sherman Birthplace =

Historic house in Ohio, United States

- U.S. National Register of Historic Places
- U.S. National Historic Landmark
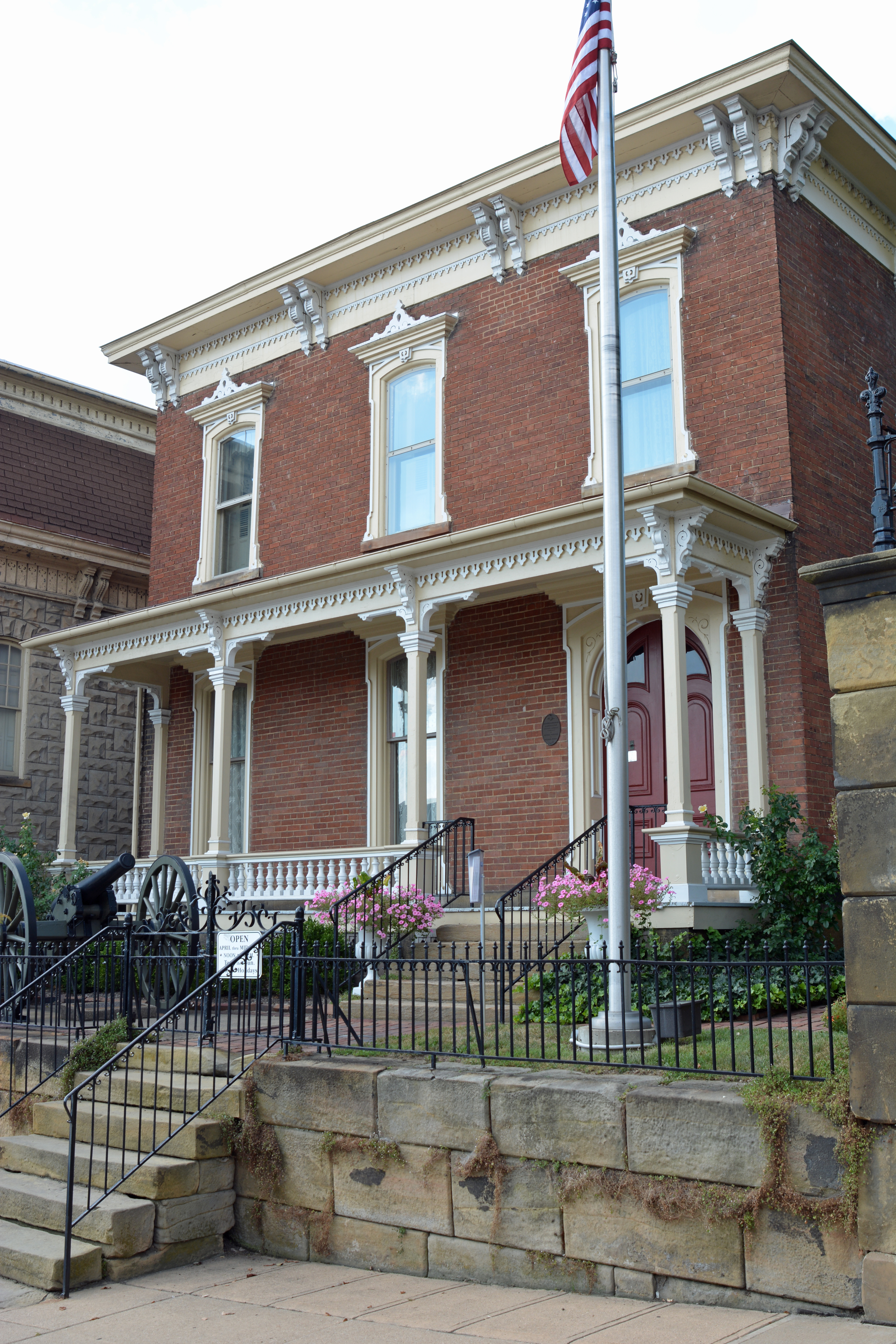
- Front of the house

- Location within Ohio Location within the United States
- Location: 137 E. Main St., Lancaster, Ohio
- Coordinates: 39.71394°N 82.6005°W
- Area: less than one acre
- Built: 1811
- Architect: Italianate
- NRHP reference No.: 66000609

Significant dates
- Added to NRHP: October 15, 1966
- Designated NHL: January 29, 1964

The John Sherman Birthplace is a historic house museum at 137 East Main Street in Lancaster, Ohio. Also known as the Sherman House Museum, it is notable as the childhood home of John Sherman (1823–1900), politician and statesman and his older brother, General William T. Sherman (1820–1891), Union Army. The museum is primarily devoted to the General. It was declared a National Historic Landmark in 1964, primarily for its association with John Sherman, namesake of the Sherman Antitrust Act. The museum is operated by the Fairfield Heritage Association, which offers tours seasonally.

== Description and history ==
The Sherman House is located on the north side of East Main Street in downtown Lancaster, between Broad and High Streets. It is a two-story brick building with a low-pitch hip roof and Italianate styling, with an older two-story wood-frame ell at the rear. The main facade is three bays wide, with a single-story porch extending across the front. The porch has bracketed and paneled posts, a dentil cornice, and a low balustrade. The main entrance is in the rightmost bay, with flanking pilasters rising to a corniced entablature set above a half-round transom. Windows are set in segmented-arch openings, with corniced surrounds.

The rear frame section of the house was built in 1811, and enlarged by 1816 by Judge Charles Sherman. It was in this house that his two most famous sons, John and William, were born. General William Tecumseh Sherman achieved great fame during the American Civil War, and it is Victorian-era furnishings that now dominate the interior. John Sherman made important contributions to the nation, serving as Treasury Secretary under President Rutherford B. Hayes and as Secretary of State under William McKinley. As United States Senator, Sherman saw through the passage of the Sherman Antitrust Act, the nation's principal legal weapon against monopolistic business practices.

The brick main section of the house was built in 1870, after the period of Sherman ownership. The house has been operated as a museum honoring the family since 1951.

== See also ==
- List of National Historic Landmarks in Ohio
