= Carl Yoder =

American industrialist

Carl M. Yoder was a leading Cleveland, Ohio, industrialist in the first half of the 20th century. He was the founder and president of The Yoder Company from 1910 until his death in 1944.

Carl Minter Yoder was born July 4, 1885, on a farm near Jefferson in Ashtabula County, Ohio. His parents were Owen and Sevilla (Minter) Yoder, who were Mennonite farmers. Carl was the youngest of four children, with two brothers and one sister. Owen died in 1886, and in 1889 his mother married Wallace Robert Williams, who in turn died in 1892. Carl's early education was in a country school, and he attended night classes at YMCA. He also took an engineering course with the International Correspondence Schools of Scranton, Pennsylvania, where he learned wood pattern-making. His first jobs were with the Buckeye Engineering Company of Salem, Ohio and the Morgan Engineering Company of Alliance, Ohio. In October 1907 he married Bertha L. Cobbs, who was born and raised near Salem, Ohio. Later that year they moved to Cleveland, Ohio, where he worked for various firms over the next three years. The Yoders subsequently had two children, Mildred and Douglas, and they built a house in Lakewood, Ohio.

In 1909, working in a room in his home, he designed a bending machine for forming the mudledge of automobile fenders. He built the first machine in a rented machine shop. He joined with his cousin, Harvey O. Yoder, who was an attorney, to form the C.M. Yoder Company in 1910. The name was changed a few years later to The Yoder Company. The company soon added several new machines to its line to make automobile sheet metal parts. In 1915 the company had grown sufficiently for it to purchase land and build a small factory on Walworth Avenue on the west side of Cleveland. In these early years, Carl was the company's engineer and salesman. In 1922 the plant burned to the ground, but within just 12 days the plant was partially rebuilt and production resumed.

In subsequent years The Yoder Company broadened its product line and became the world leader in cold roll forming machines. This is a process whereby a flat strip of metal is formed into a desired shape by passing it through a series of matching pairs of contoured rolls. Metal can travel through these machines at up to 150 feet per minute. The company also produced tube and pipe mills using the same process. During World War II, the company converted to war production. It produced over 2000 57-millimeter guns and a million and a half 105-millimeter shells. Employment rose to over 800 during this period.

Carl Yoder was active in civic, educational and religious affairs. He was a trustee of Baldwin-Wallace College, as well as on the board of various local organizations. He was also a member of Lakewood Methodist Church. In his later years he acquired land in Lake County, Florida, and planted orange groves.

Carl Yoder died of cancer on September 28, 1944, in Lakewood, Ohio.
