= James A. Garfield National Historic Site =

National Historic Site of the United States

- U.S. National Register of Historic Places
- U.S. National Historic Landmark
- U.S. National Historic Site
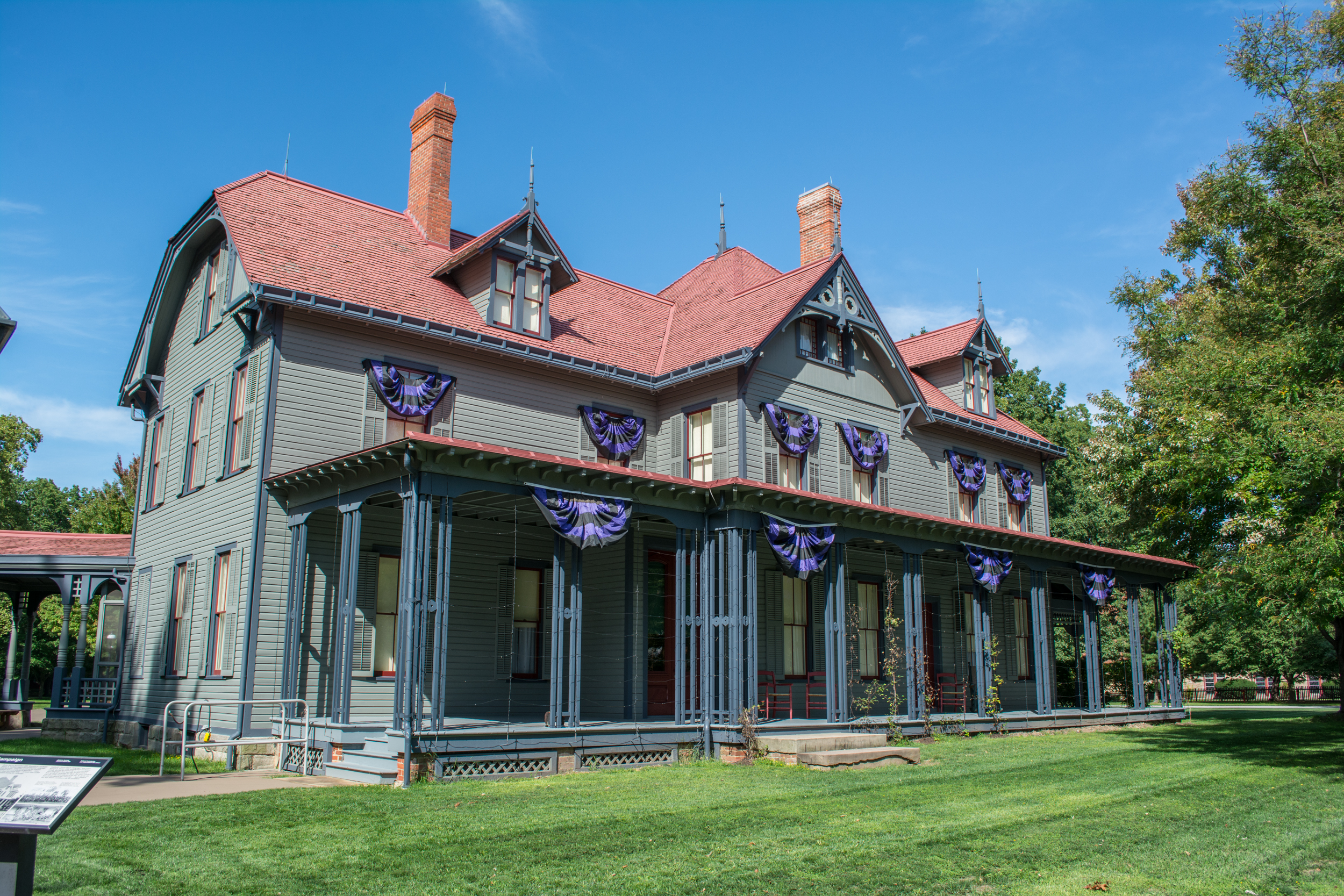
- Garfield's home, restored to original color
- Interactive map showing James A. Garfield National Historic Site’s location
- Location: 8095 Mentor Avenue, Mentor, Ohio
- Coordinates: 41°39′50.256″N 81°21′3.2652″W
- Area: 4.9 acres (2.0 ha)
- Built: 1876
- Visitation: 36,553 (2023)
- Website: James A. Garfield National Historic Site.
- NRHP reference No.: 66000613 (original); 15000675 (increase)

Significant dates
- Added to NRHP: October 15, 1966
- Boundary increase: September 29, 2015
- Designated NHL: January 28, 1964
- Designated NHS: December 28, 1980

James A. Garfield National Historic Site is a United States National Historic Site located in Mentor, Ohio. The site preserves the Lawnfield estate and surrounding property of James A. Garfield, the 20th president of the United States, and includes the first presidential library established in the United States.

== History ==
James A. Garfield acquired the home in 1876 to accommodate his large family. During the 1880 presidential election, Garfield conducted what became the first successful front porch campaign from the home, which became known as "Lawnfield" by the reporters covering his campaign. That same year, Garfield had 11 rooms added to the building to accommodate his large family. Garfield was shot four months into his term and died on September 19, 1881. Four years after his assassination, his widow Lucretia Garfield and her family added the Memorial Library wing, setting the precedent for presidential libraries.

Garfield purchased the Mentor residence for several reasons. Until this time, he had been a resident of Hiram and represented the 19th Ohio congressional district. The Democratic Ohio Legislature had redistricted and removed the Republican Party counties of Ashtabula, Lake, Geauga, and Trumbull from the district, leaving only the Democratic Party counties of Ashland, Stark and Wayne.

Garfield also wanted a place where his sons could learn about farming, as well as a permanent residence where he could spend his summers while Congress was on recess.

Lucretia Garfield lived in the house at least part of every year until her death in 1918. Her brother, Joseph Rudolph, lived there until he died in 1934. In 1936, Garfield's children donated the house and its contents to the Western Reserve Historical Society for use as a museum. On December 28, 1980, the United States Congress declared the Garfield home a National Historic Site.

The site was operated by the National Park Service with the Western Reserve Historical Society until January 2008, at which time the WRHS transferred the site's land, buildings and operation to the National Park Service. As of February 2015 the site is managed by Cuyahoga Valley National Park.

== Restoration ==
In the 1990s, a $12.5 million, six-year restoration of the Garfield house took place, with a grand reopening in 1998. The house was redecorated with authentic furniture and household items of 1886–1904 acquired through extensive research by the Denver Service Center of the National Park Service.

The Garfield Historical Site is one of the most accurately restored and highly detailed of the 19th-century U.S. presidential sites. Of its hundreds of examples of antique Victorian furniture, over 80% was owned by the Garfield family themselves in the 1880s. Many others were acquired or recreated by the National Park Service to supplement the collection. Ten wallpapers were also reproduced from photographs, and from samples found under layers of wallpaper applied through the subsequent decades.

== Gallery ==
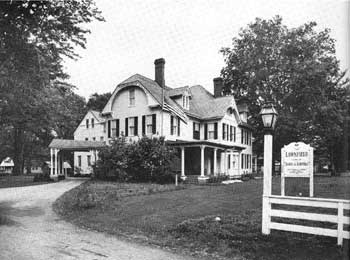
James Garfield's home, before restoration, 1976

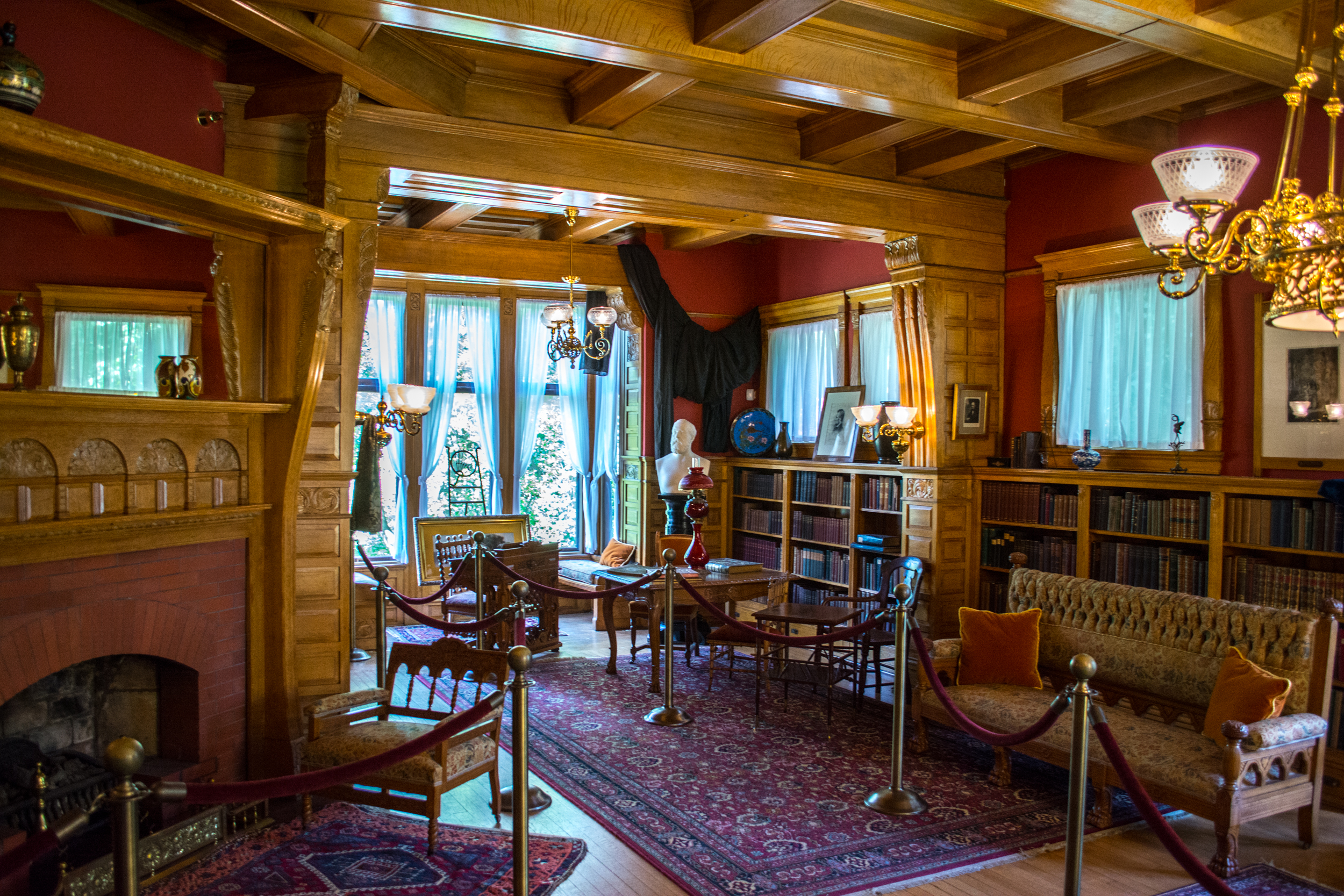
Library

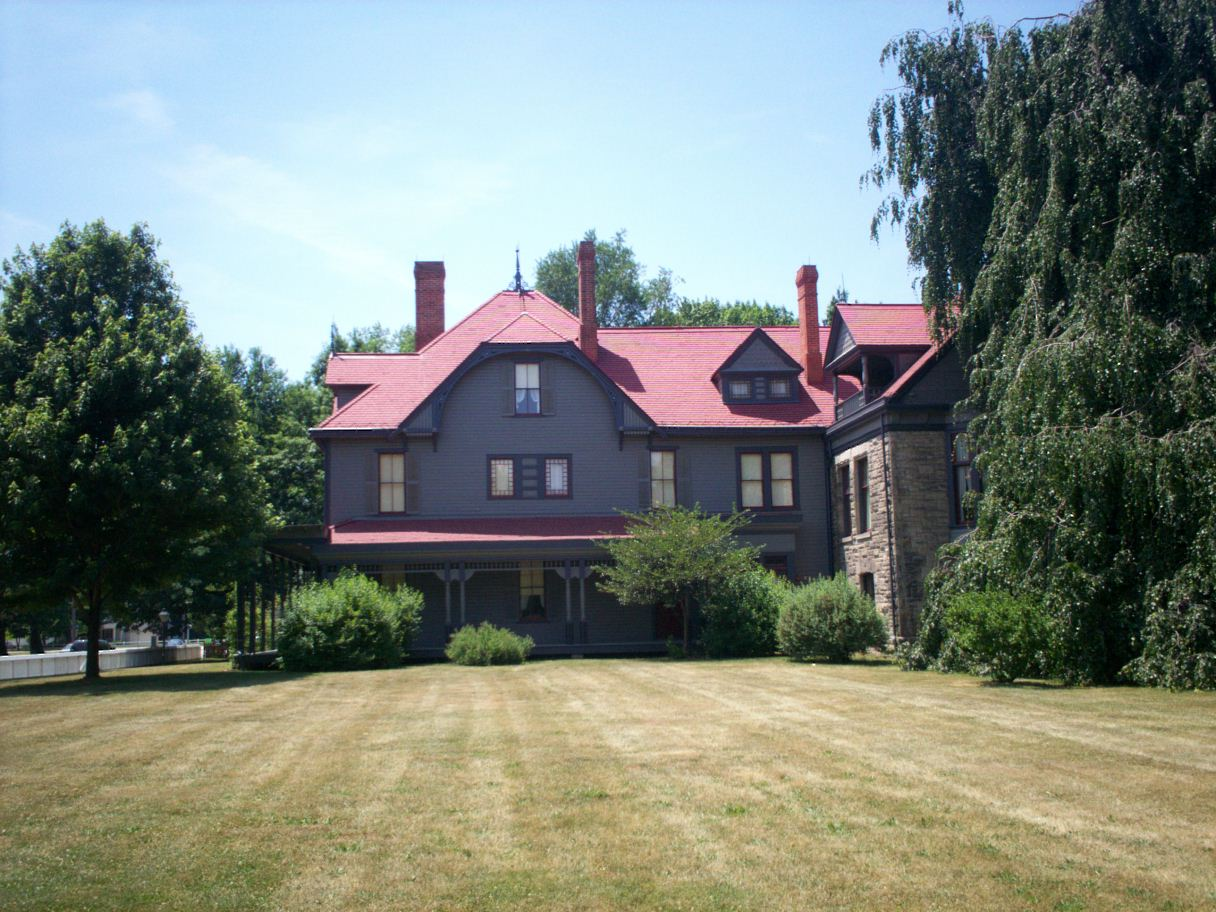
Garfield's home, east facade, 2007

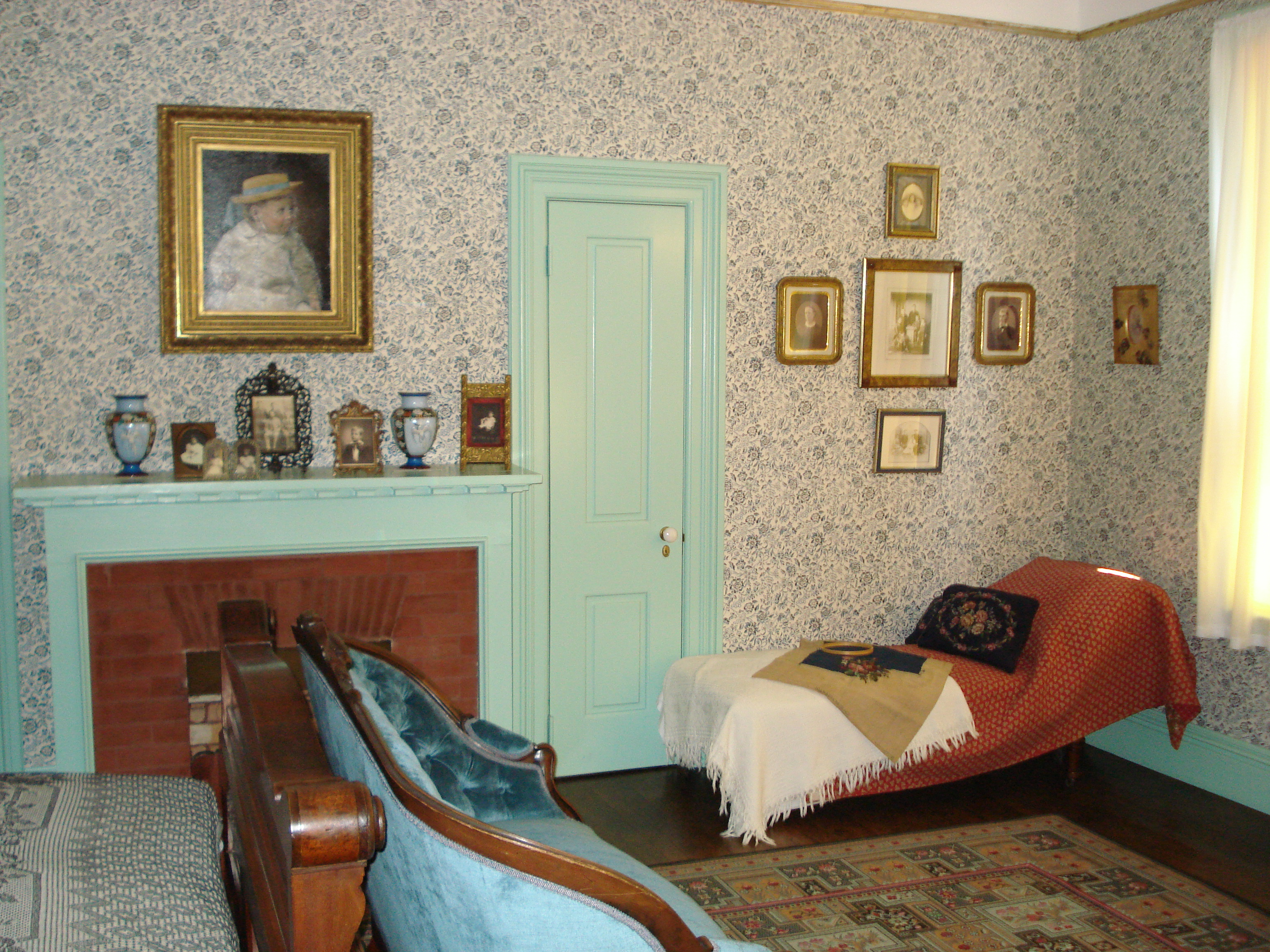
Period bedroom in the Garfield home

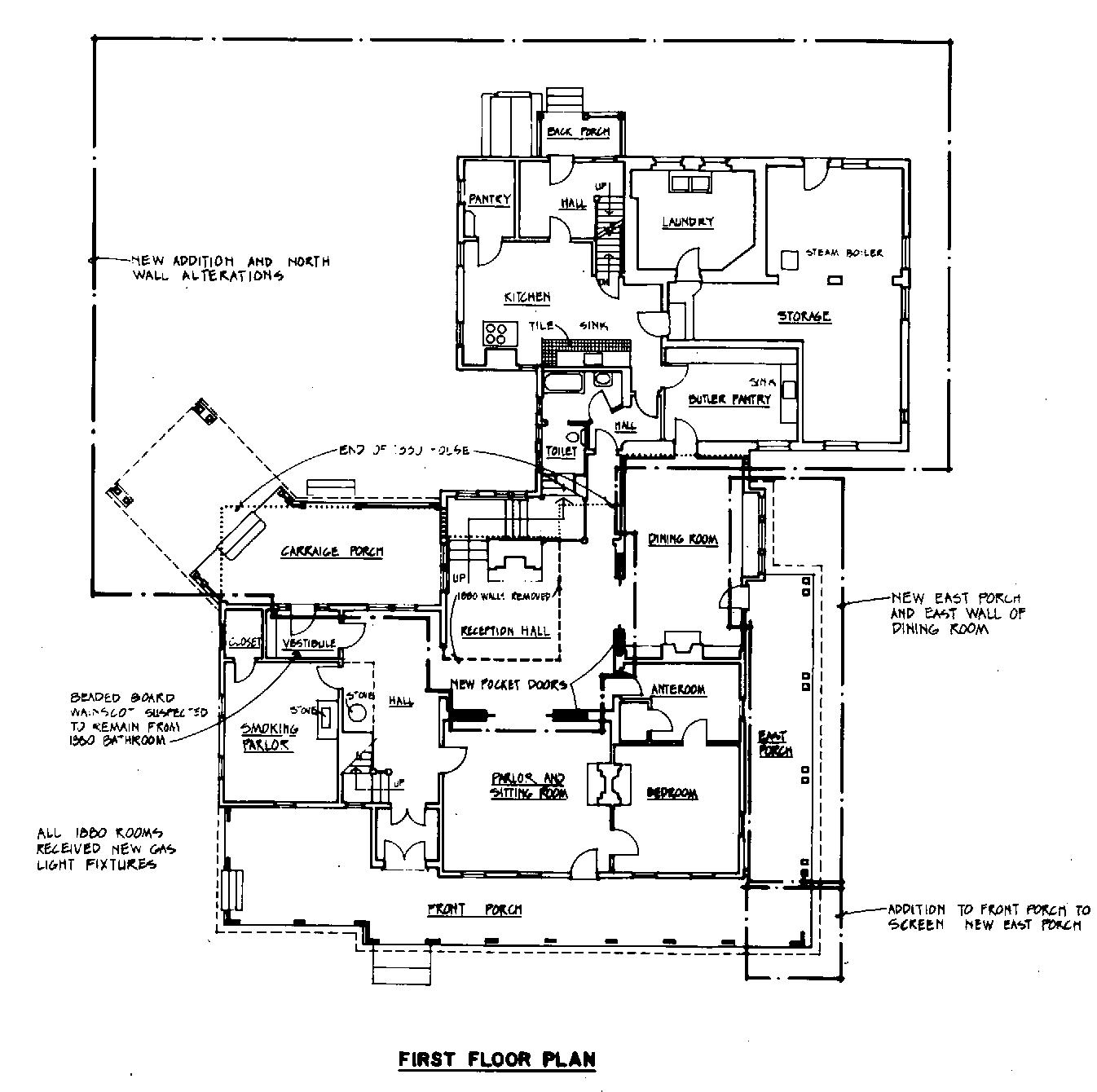
First floor 1885

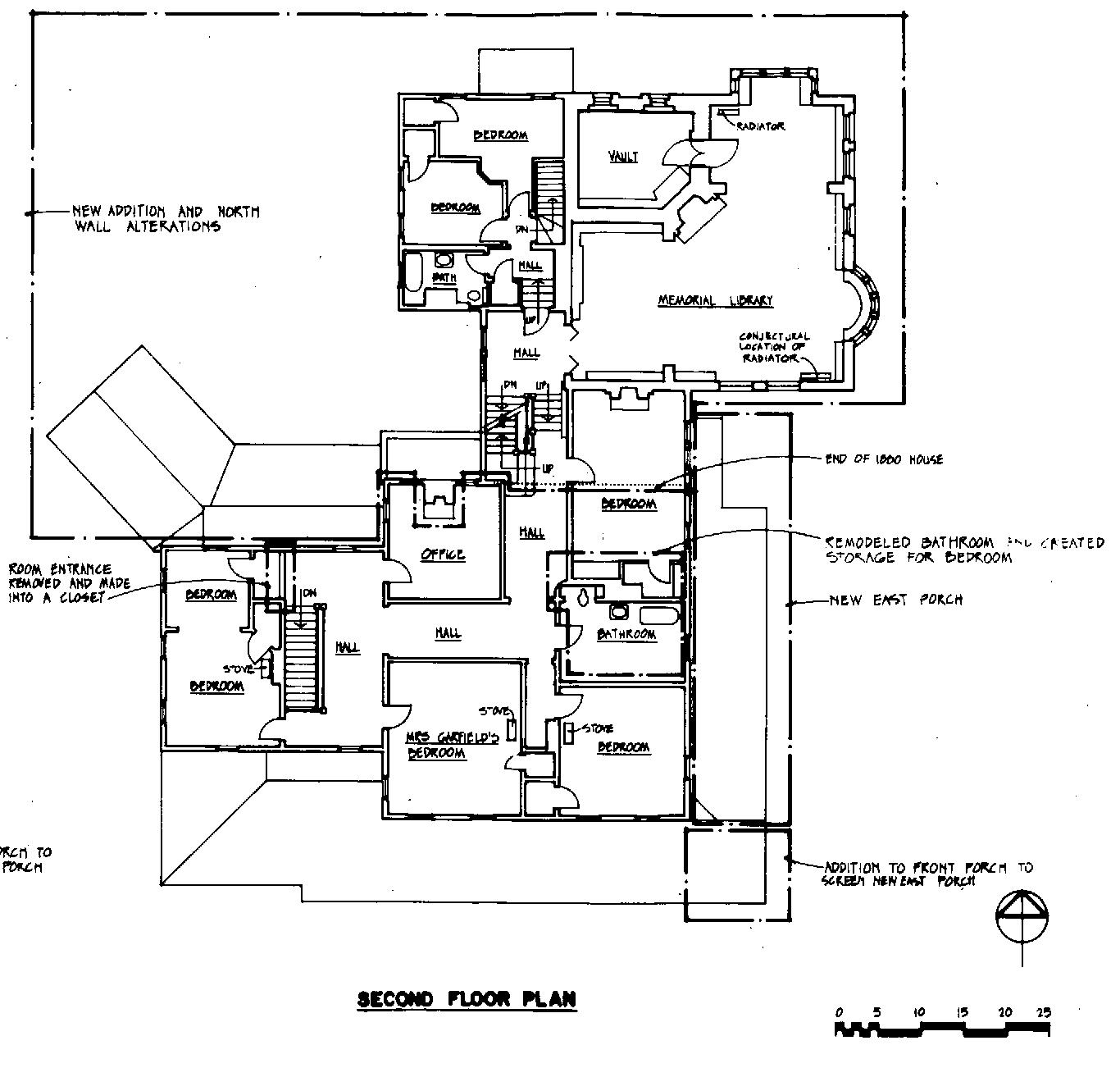
Second floor 1885

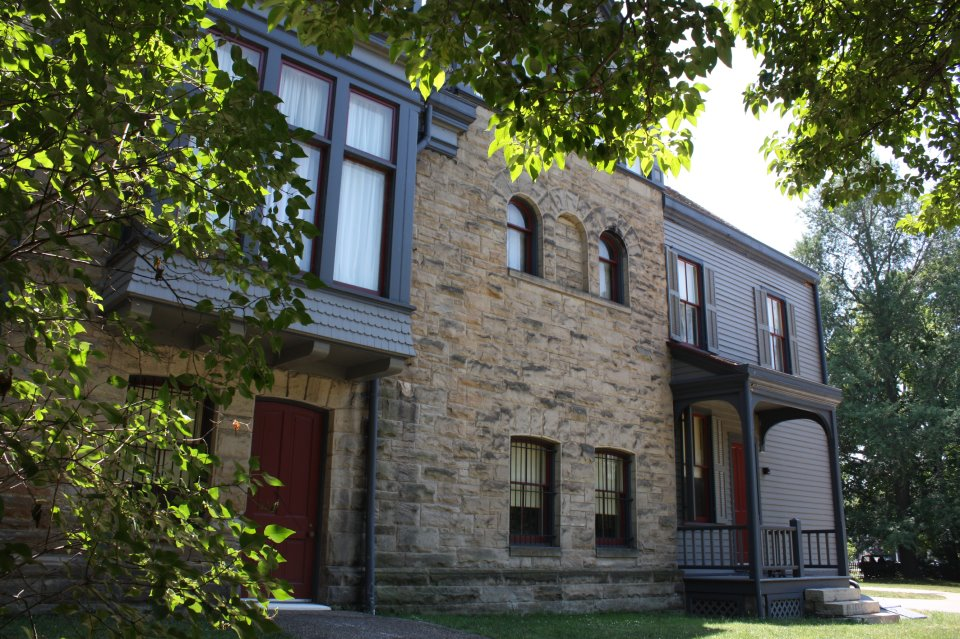

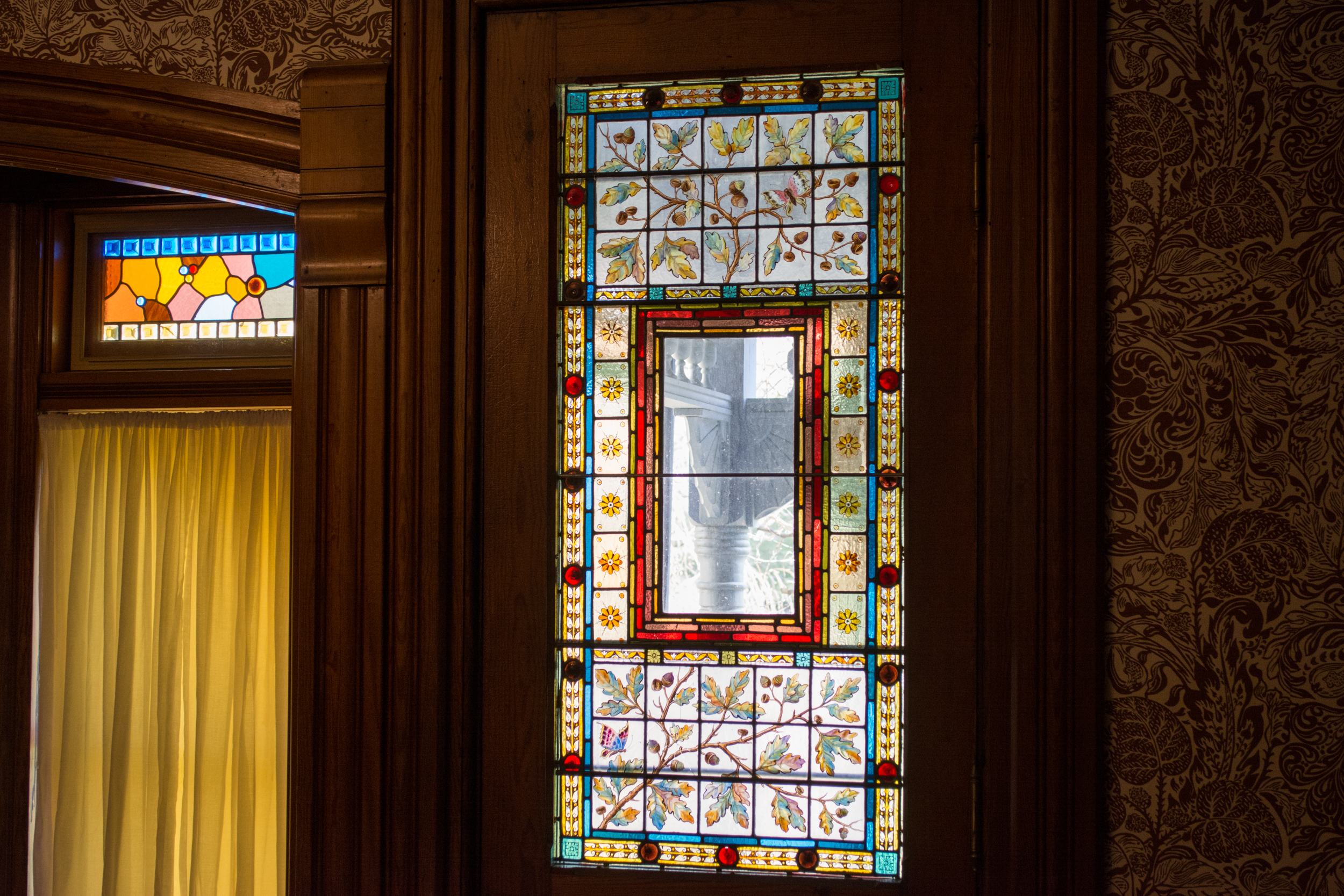

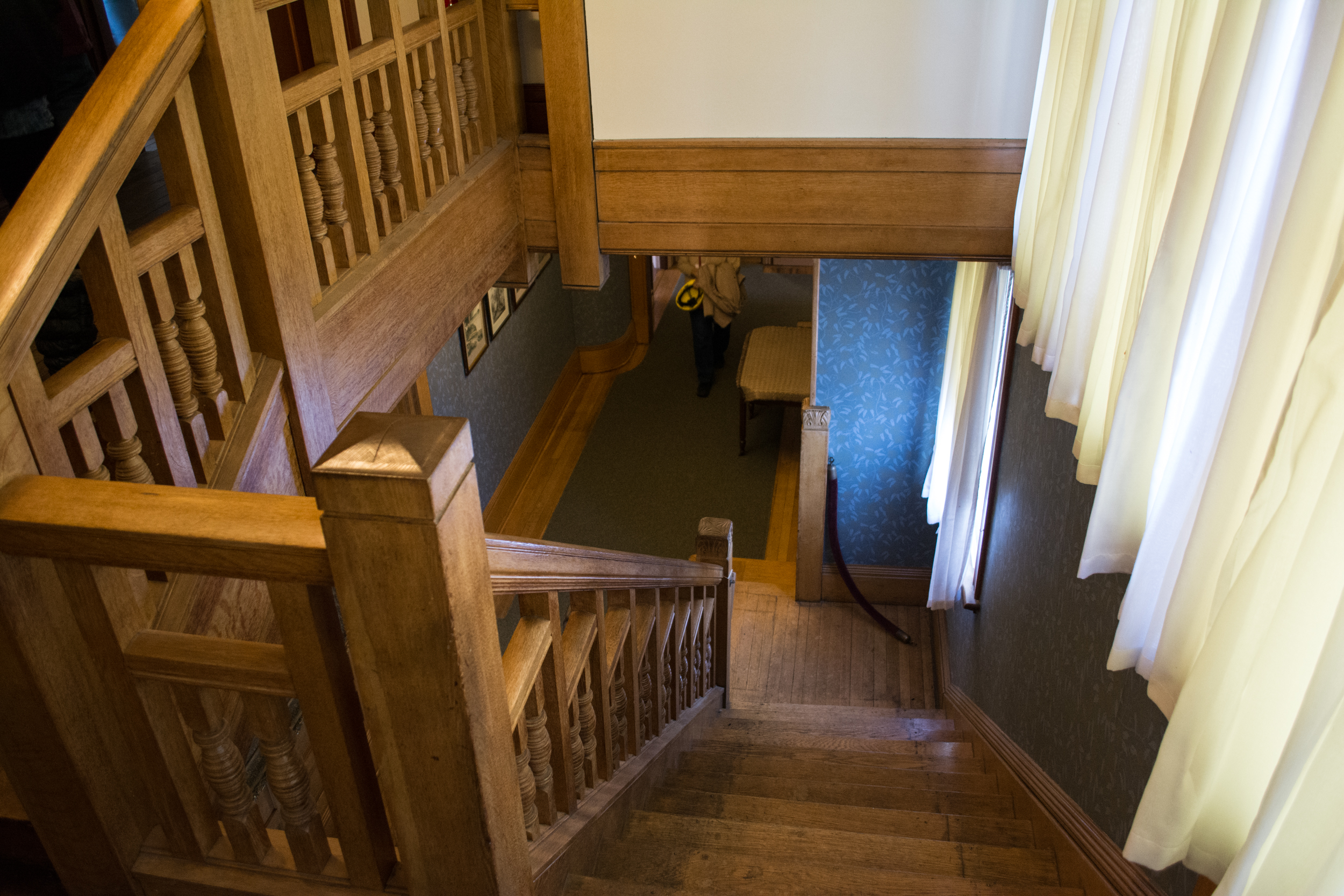

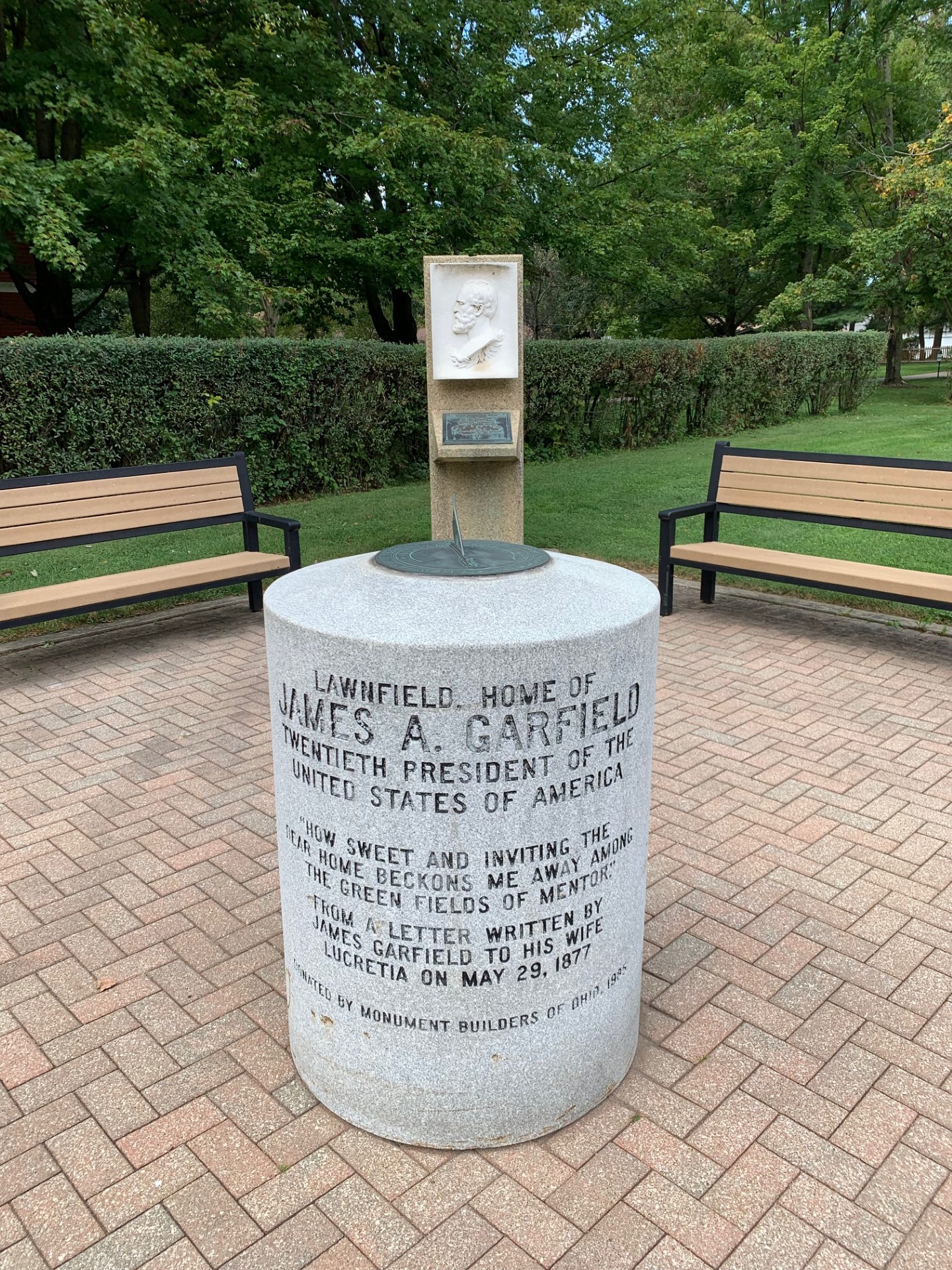
Sundial Monument

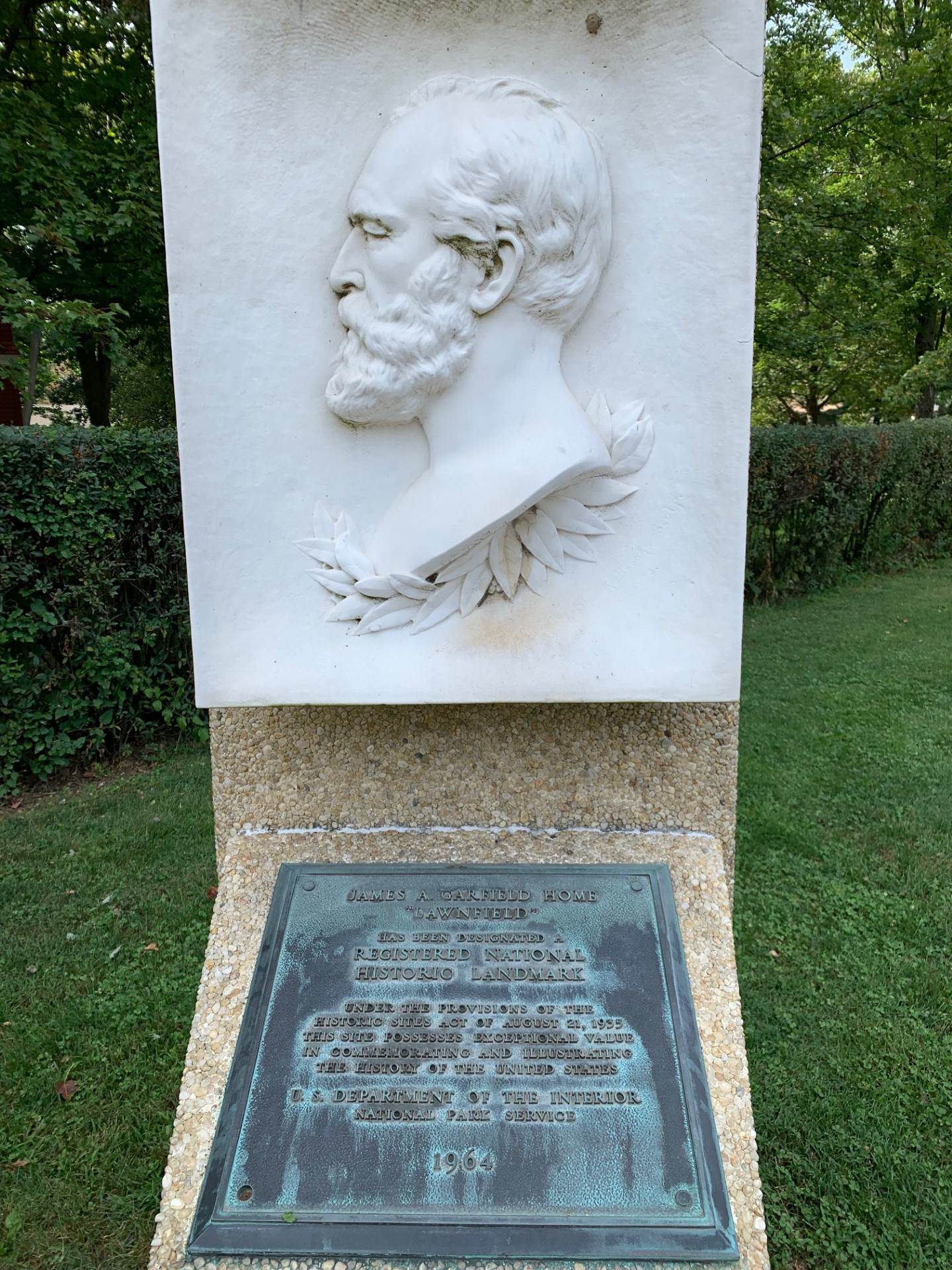
Commemorative plaque

== See also ==
- List of residences of presidents of the United States
- Presidential memorials in the United States
