= Jefferson Area High School =

Location
- 207 West Mulberry Street; Jefferson, Ashtabula, Ohio 44047; United States; 41°44′4″N 80°46′52″W

Information
- School type: Public, Coeducational
- Established: 1962
- School district: Jefferson Area Local School District
- NCES District ID: 3904587
- Superintendent: John Montanaro
- NCES School ID: 390458702372
- Principal: Richard Shields
- Teaching staff: 18.07 (FTE)
- Grades: 9-12
- Enrollment: 427 (2023-2024)
- Student to teacher ratio: 23.63
- Color
- Athletics conference: Chagrin Valley Conference
- Mascot: Falcon
- Yearbook: Talon
- Website: https://www.jalsd.org/schools/jahs

Jefferson Area High School is the only high School in Jefferson, Ohio. It is the only high school in the Jefferson Area Local School District. Athletic teams are known as the Falcons, and they compete as a member of the Ohio High School Athletic Association in the Chagrin Valley Conference.

== History ==
Opened in 1962, Jefferson Area High School serves students grades 9-12.

Jefferson Area High School formed following the consolidation of nearby township schools in the early 1960s.

in 2007, construction began on a new Junior/Senior High School, which opened in 2009

== Athletics ==
Jefferson Area High School currently offers:

- Baseball
- Basketball
- Bowling
- Cheerleading
- Cross Country
- Golf
- Football
- Soccer
- Softball
- Swimming
- Tennis
- Track and field
- Volleyball
- Wrestling

== Music programs ==
The school offers programs such as Marching band, Show Choir, Treble Choir, Concert Choir, Jazz Band, and Music Technology.

== Notable alumni ==
- Matthew Hatchette - former professional football player in the National Football League (NFL)
- Boogie Knight - professional football player in the Liga de Fútbol Americano Profesional (LFA)
