= Jefferson, Ohio =

- Village
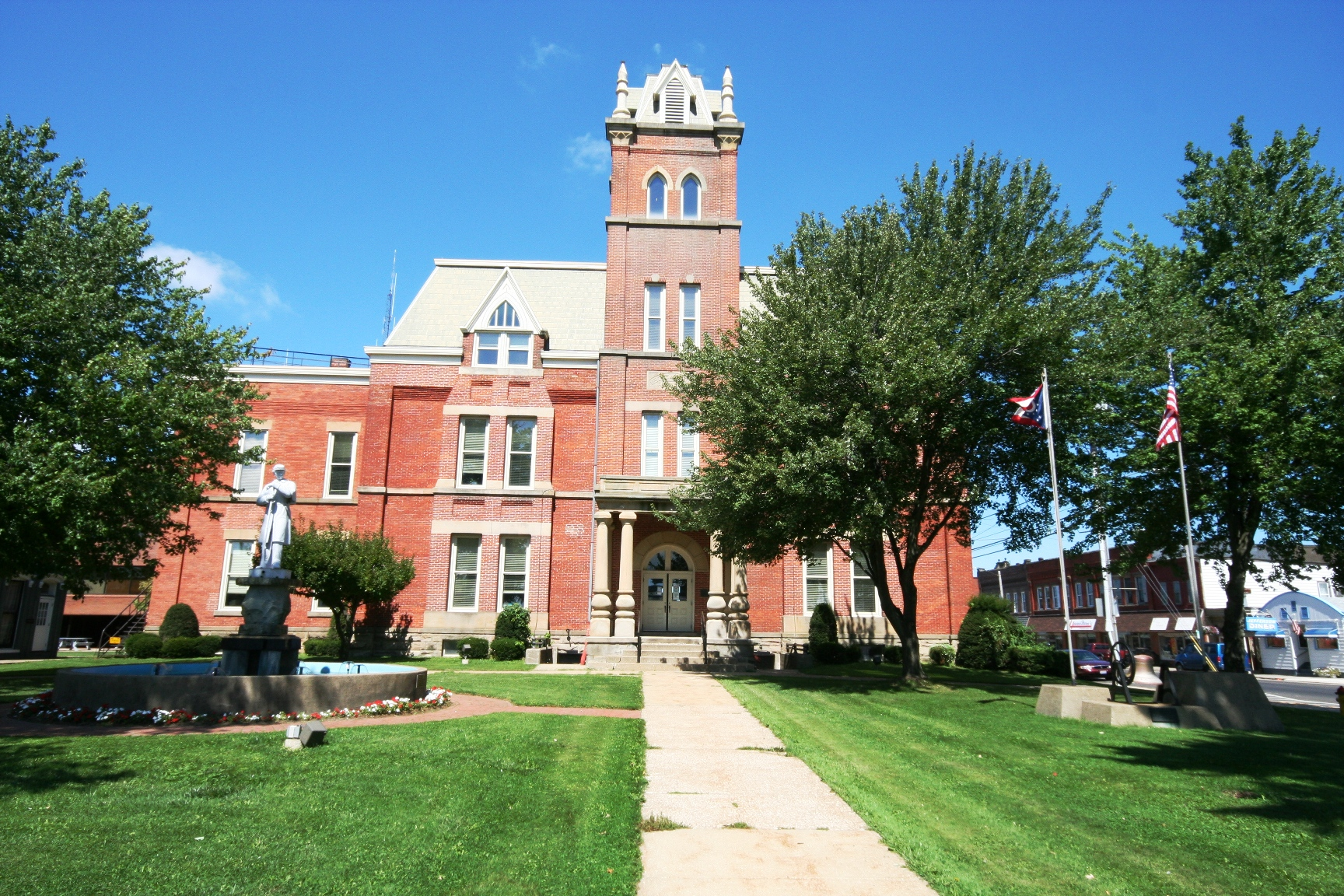
- Ashtabula County Courthouse
- Interactive map of Jefferson, Ohio
- Location within Ohio Location within the United States
- Coordinates: 41°44′19″N 80°45′25″W
- Country: United States
- State: Ohio
- County: Ashtabula
- Township: Jefferson

Area
  - Total: 2.54 sq mi (6.57 km^{2})
  - Land: 2.54 sq mi (6.57 km^{2})
  - Water: 0 sq mi (0.00 km^{2})
- Elevation: 961 ft (293 m)

Population (2020)
  - Total: 3,226
  - Density: 1,271.8/sq mi (491.04/km^{2})
- Time zone: UTC-5 (Eastern (EST))
  - Summer (DST): UTC-4 (EDT)
- ZIP code: 44047
- Area code: 440
- FIPS code: 39-38500
- GNIS feature ID: 1042061
- Website: jeffersonohio.gov

Jefferson is a village in Ashtabula County, Ohio, United States, and its county seat. The population was 3,226 at the 2020 census. It is part of the Cleveland Metropolitan Area, 50 miles (80 km) northeast of Cleveland.

Modern-day Jefferson sports the world's only perambulator museum and a historical complex including several restored 19th-century buildings. Joshua Giddings' law office has also been restored as a museum. Annual village events include the Ashtabula County Fair, the Strawberry Festival, Jefferson Days, and the Covered Bridge Festival.

== History ==
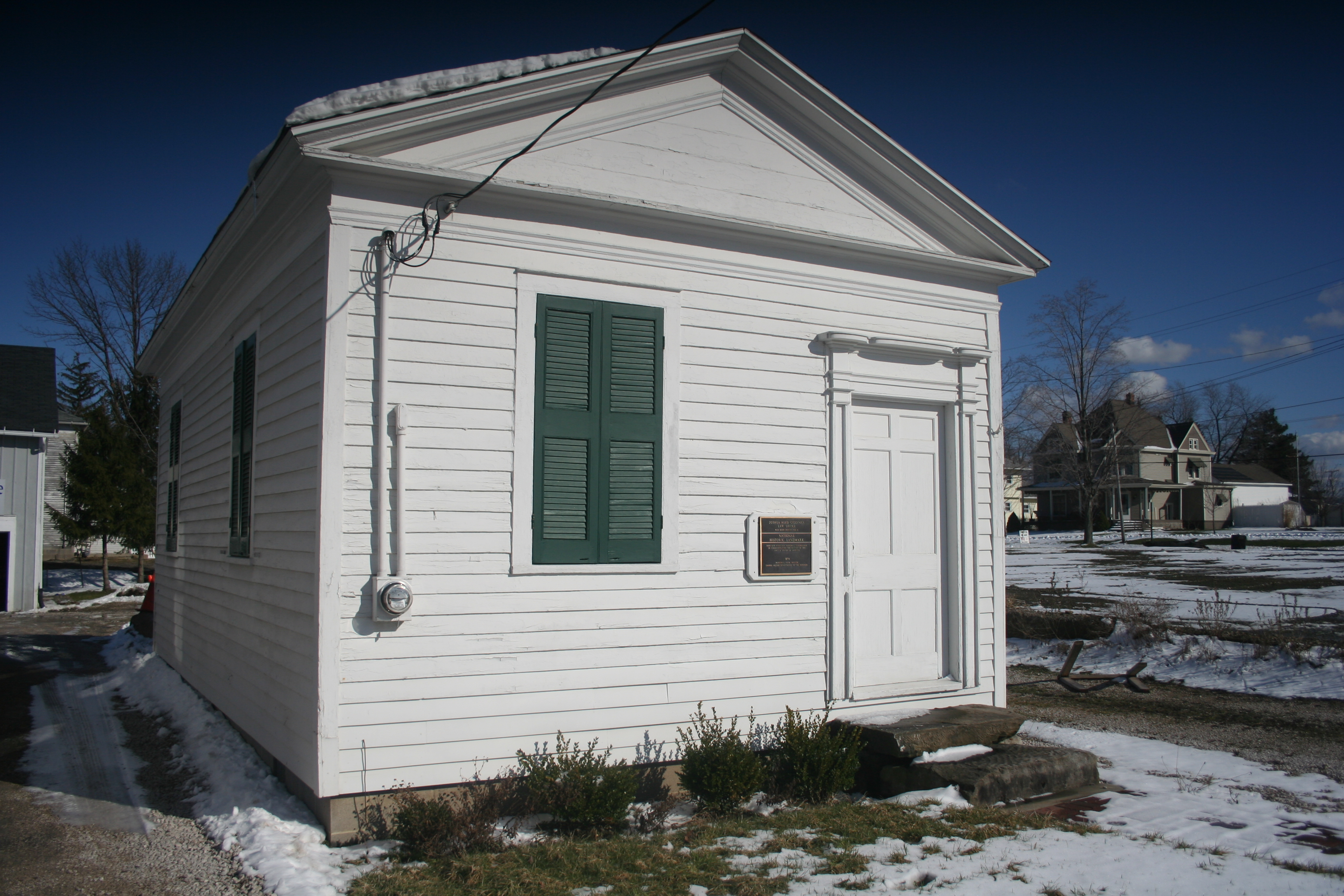
Joshua Reed Giddings Law Office

Jefferson was officially founded by Gideon Granger, U.S. Postmaster General during Thomas Jefferson's administration, in 1803. He envisioned the new settlement as a "Philadelphia of the West," and early plans for the village were based upon the layout of that city. A cabin was erected by Granger's agent in 1804, but the settlement's first permanent residents arrived only in 1805: the Samuel Wilson family. Wilson, misled by land agents, moved to Ohio in late autumn expecting to find a thriving city on Granger's land. Instead, he found a wilderness, broken only by trees emblazoned with Philadelphian street names, marking where future streets would be built. Wilson himself died after two weeks of herculean effort to prepare for the winter, but his family stayed on as the first citizens of Jefferson. In 1811, Jefferson was made the county seat of Ashtabula County.

Jefferson's two most famous sons were Congressman Joshua Reed Giddings and Senator Benjamin Wade, two prominent Whig Party and later Republican Party abolitionists. In 1831, the two men formed a law practice in Jefferson and worked together until Giddings was elected to Congress in 1838. Wade successfully ran for the Ohio State Senate in 1837, then won election to the US Senate in 1851. Both were instrumental in the foundation of the Republican Party and defied the "Gag Rule" barring discussion of slavery prior to the American Civil War. Jefferson itself was a hotbed of abolitionism. Abolitionist John Brown spoke in the village, and several of its houses acted as stations on the Underground Railway. During the American Civil War, it trained Union recruits at Fort Giddings, which stood in the village at the current site of the fairgrounds. Wade later was merely one vote shy of assuming the acting Presidency due to the impeachment trial of Andrew Johnson.

== Geography ==
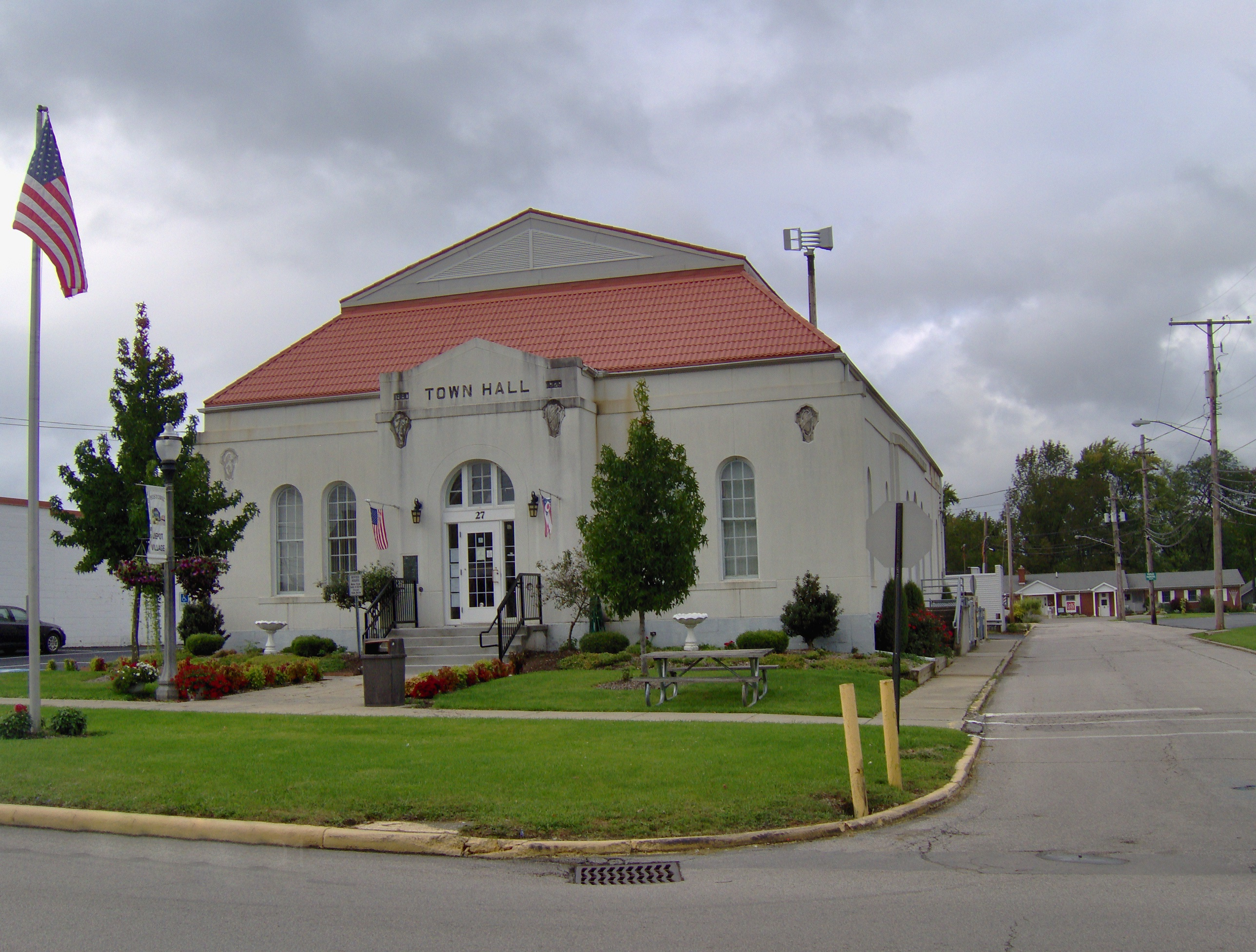
Jefferson Town Hall

Jefferson is located within Jefferson Township. According to the United States Census Bureau, the village has a total area of 2.52 square miles (6.53 km^{2}), all land. The village's principal watercourse is Mill Creek.

== Demographics ==
Historical population
| Census | Pop. | Note | %± |
|---|---|---|---|
| 1850 | 439 | | — |
| 1860 | 658 | | 49.9% |
| 1870 | 869 | | 32.1% |
| 1880 | 1,008 | | 16.0% |
| 1890 | 1,346 | | 33.5% |
| 1900 | 1,319 | | −2.0% |
| 1910 | 1,461 | | 10.8% |
| 1920 | 1,532 | | 4.9% |
| 1930 | 1,691 | | 10.4% |
| 1940 | 1,676 | | −0.9% |
| 1950 | 1,844 | | 10.0% |
| 1960 | 2,116 | | 14.8% |
| 1970 | 2,472 | | 16.8% |
| 1980 | 2,952 | | 19.4% |
| 1990 | 3,331 | | 12.8% |
| 2000 | 3,572 | | 7.2% |
| 2010 | 3,120 | | −12.7% |
| 2020 | 3,226 | | 3.4% |
U.S. Decennial Census

=== 2020 census ===
As of the 2020 census, Jefferson had a population of 3,226. The median age was 41.6 years. 23.3% of residents were under the age of 18 and 23.4% of residents were 65 years of age or older. For every 100 females there were 83.1 males, and for every 100 females age 18 and over there were 81.1 males age 18 and over.

0.0% of residents lived in urban areas, while 100.0% lived in rural areas.

There were 1,368 households in Jefferson, of which 28.6% had children under the age of 18 living in them. Of all households, 37.9% were married-couple households, 17.6% were households with a male householder and no spouse or partner present, and 36.8% were households with a female householder and no spouse or partner present. About 35.8% of all households were made up of individuals and 19.1% had someone living alone who was 65 years of age or older.

There were 1,450 housing units, of which 5.7% were vacant. The homeowner vacancy rate was 1.0% and the rental vacancy rate was 5.6%.

Racial composition as of the 2020 census
| Race | Number | Percent |
|---|---|---|
| White | 3,049 | 94.5% |
| Black or African American | 30 | 0.9% |
| American Indian and Alaska Native | 1 | 0.0% |
| Asian | 8 | 0.2% |
| Native Hawaiian and Other Pacific Islander | 1 | 0.0% |
| Some other race | 11 | 0.3% |
| Two or more races | 126 | 3.9% |
| Hispanic or Latino (of any race) | 64 | 2.0% |

=== 2010 census ===
As of the census of 2010, there were 3,120 people, 1,290 households, and 809 families living in the village. The population density was 1,238.1 inhabitants per square mile (478.0/km^{2}). There were 1,400 housing units at an average density of 555.6 per square mile (214.5/km^{2}). The racial makeup of the village was 97.1% White, 1.1% African American, 0.1% Native American, 0.4% Asian, 0.1% from other races, and 1.3% from two or more races. Hispanic or Latino of any race were 1.0% of the population.

There were 1,290 households, of which 30.9% had children under the age of 18 living with them, 43.4% were married couples living together, 14.3% had a female householder with no husband present, 5.0% had a male householder with no wife present, and 37.3% were non-families. 32.1% of all households were made up of individuals, and 16.3% had someone living alone who was 65 years of age or older. The average household size was 2.30 and the average family size was 2.89.

The median age in the village was 43 years. 22.5% of residents were under the age of 18; 7.1% were between the ages of 18 and 24; 22.7% were from 25 to 44; 27.3% were from 45 to 64; and 20.4% were 65 years of age or older. The gender makeup of the village was 45.6% male and 54.4% female.

=== 2000 census ===
As of the census of 2000, there were 3,572 people, 1,357 households, and 933 families living in the village. The population density was 1,566.5 inhabitants per square mile (604.8/km^{2}). There were 1,425 housing units at an average density of 625.0 per square mile (241.3/km^{2}). The racial makeup of the village was 97.17% White, 1.43% African American, 0.25% Native American, 0.22% Asian, 0.14% from other races, and 0.78% from two or more races. Hispanic or Latino of any race were 0.62% of the population. 19.1% were of German, 14.6% English, 12.7% Italian, 11.3% Irish and 10.8% American ancestry according to Census 2000.

There were 1,357 households, out of which 34.0% had children under the age of 18 living with them, 51.1% were married couples living together, 14.2% had a female householder with no husband present, and 31.2% were non-families. 27.7% of all households were made up of individuals, and 13.1% had someone living alone who was 65 years of age or older. The average household size was 2.47 and the average family size was 2.99.

In the village, the population was spread out, with 25.3% under the age of 18, 9.9% from 18 to 24, 26.8% from 25 to 44, 21.0% from 45 to 64, and 17.1% who were 65 years of age or older. The median age was 37 years. For every 100 females, there were 85.4 males. For every 100 females age 18 and over, there were 82.4 males.

The median income for a household in the village was $36,883, and the median income for a family was $46,313. Males had a median income of $34,341 versus $25,036 for females. The per capita income for the village was $18,371. About 3.9% of families and 5.8% of the population were below the poverty line, including 6.4% of those under age 18 and 8.0% of those age 65 or over.

== Education ==
Children in Jefferson are served by the Jefferson Area Local School District. The Jefferson Area Local School District, located in Ashtabula County, Ohio, encompasses nearly 130 square miles and serves students from the villages of Jefferson, Rock Creek, and Roaming Shores as well as students from parts of Austinburg, Denmark, Dorset, Jefferson, Lenox, Morgan, New Lyme, Plymouth, Rome, Sheffield, and Trumbull Townships. Approximately 1,700 students are enrolled in our 4 schools: Jefferson Area High School (9–12), Jefferson Area Junior High (7–8), Jefferson Elementary School (K–6), and Rock Creek Elementary School (K–6).

== Notable people ==
- Julius C. Burrows, U.S. Representative and a U.S. Senator from Michigan
- Theodore Elijah Burton, U.S. Representative and U.S. Senator from Ohio
- Joshua Reed Giddings, attorney, politician and a prominent opponent of slavery
- Matthew Hatchette, NFL wide receiver
- John L. Hervey, prominent authority on thoroughbred horses
- Branden Lee Hinkle, mixed martial artist
- Elbert L. Lampson, 21st Lieutenant Governor of Ohio, former state Senator
- James J. Nance, president of Hotpoint and later as the last president of the Packard Motor Car Company
- Platt Rogers Spencer, creator of Spencerian penmanship, a popular system of cursive handwriting
- George Van Tassel, UFO enthusiast and religious cult leader
- Benjamin Franklin Wade, lawyer and U.S. Senator, President pro tempore of Senate
- Carl Yoder, industrialist
