= Soldiers' and Sailors' Monument (Cleveland) =

Monument in Cleveland, Ohio

Coordinates: 41°29′58″N 81°41′37″W

The Cuyahoga County Soldiers' and Sailors' Monument
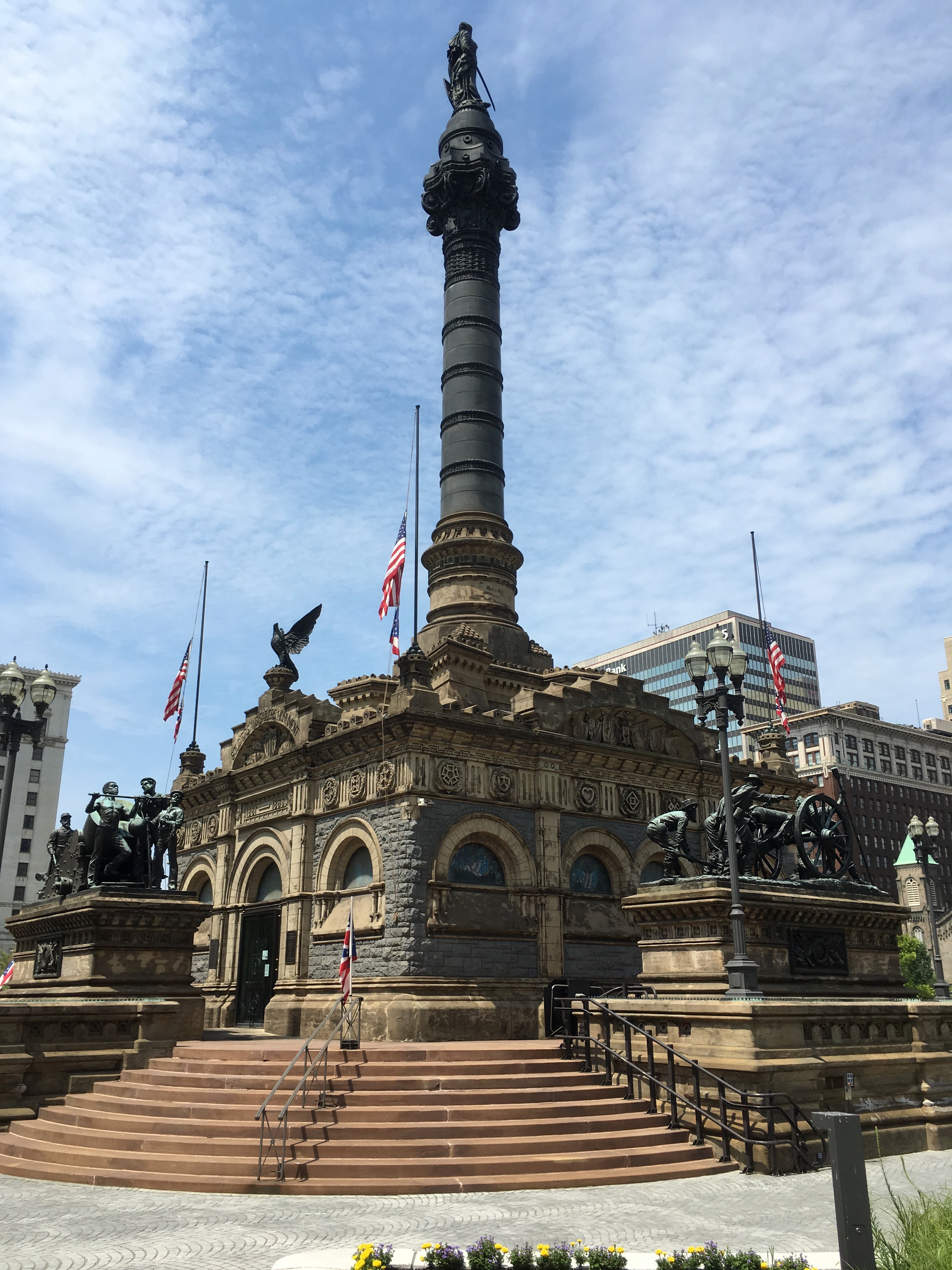
- The Southeast corner of the monument seen from Euclid Avenue. The entrance to the tablet room is visible.
- Interactive map of the The Cuyahoga County Soldiers' and Sailors' Monument area

General information
- Location: Cleveland, Ohio, 3 Public Square, United States
- Opened: July 4, 1894
- Renovated: 2008
- Cost: $272,800

Design and construction
- Architect: Levi Scofield

The Cuyahoga County Soldiers' and Sailors' Monument is a major Civil War monument in Cleveland, Ohio, honoring the more than 9,000 individuals from Cuyahoga County who served the Union throughout the war. It was dedicated on July 4, 1894, and is located on the southeast quadrant of Public Square in Downtown Cleveland. It was designed by architect and Civil War veteran Levi Scofield, who also created the monument's sculptures. The monument is regularly open to the public, free of charge.

== History and construction ==
=== Planning (1880–1890) ===
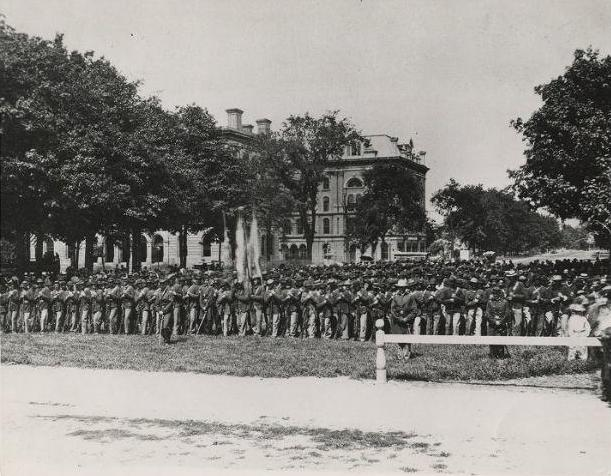
Civil War Soldiers on Public Square (1865)

On October 22, 1879, a meeting of Civil War veterans took place in Cleveland, wherein an idea to build a monument was proposed. At this meeting, a resolution was unanimously approved, “to appoint a committee of three, whose duty it will be to formulate a plan for the erection of a suitable monument or memorial to commemorate the Union Soldiers and Sailors of Cuyahoga County.” Shortly thereafter, a convention of the soldiers and sailors of Cuyahoga County was held on October 30. The 1,200 veterans in attendance discussed the idea of creating a monument and chose a seven-man committee to lobby the Ohio General Assembly for funding.

On April 2, 1880, an act was passed through the Ohio State Legislature authorizing the Commissioners of Cuyahoga County to levy a county wide tax for the purpose of, “erecting a Monument or Memorial Tablet commemorative of the bravery and valor of all the Soldiers and Sailors from said county, who were killed in any of the battles fought in the service of the Republic of the United States, or who died from wounds or disease received or contracted in such service, and purchase a suitable site therefor.”

In 1886, at a meeting of the Soldiers’ and Sailors’ Union, an agreement was reached regarding the general design. Some favored a traditional obelisk or shaft, others preferred the idea of a tablet room. Levi T. Scofield, a local veteran and successful architect, was asked to draw up designs and plans for the future structure and proposed a unique combination of the two styles – a tablet room with an obelisk.

With the design well in progress, the next question was as to the location of the monument. The initial proposal was to round off the four corners of Cleveland's Public Square and to place a large statue right in the center of the square at the junction of Ontario Street and Superior Avenue. Before this plan could be implemented, the railroad companies developing the rapidly expanding street car system in the city laid claim to the intersection. Other locations throughout the city were considered for the future monument. Nevertheless, the Monument Committee remained stalwart in their desire to see the structure built on Public Square.

The Southeast quadrant at the terminus of Euclid Avenue was selected as the most ideal and appropriate site. Negotiations were then begun with the Park Commissioners of the City of Cleveland who maintained Public Square to secure the Southeast quadrant for the project. In April 1888, The General Assembly of the State of Ohio passed House Bill 462 to create a “Board of Commissioners, to be called the Monumental Commissioners of Cuyahoga County, to be composed of twelve persons, who shall be resident electors of said county, and members of the present Monumental Committee of the Cuyahoga County.”

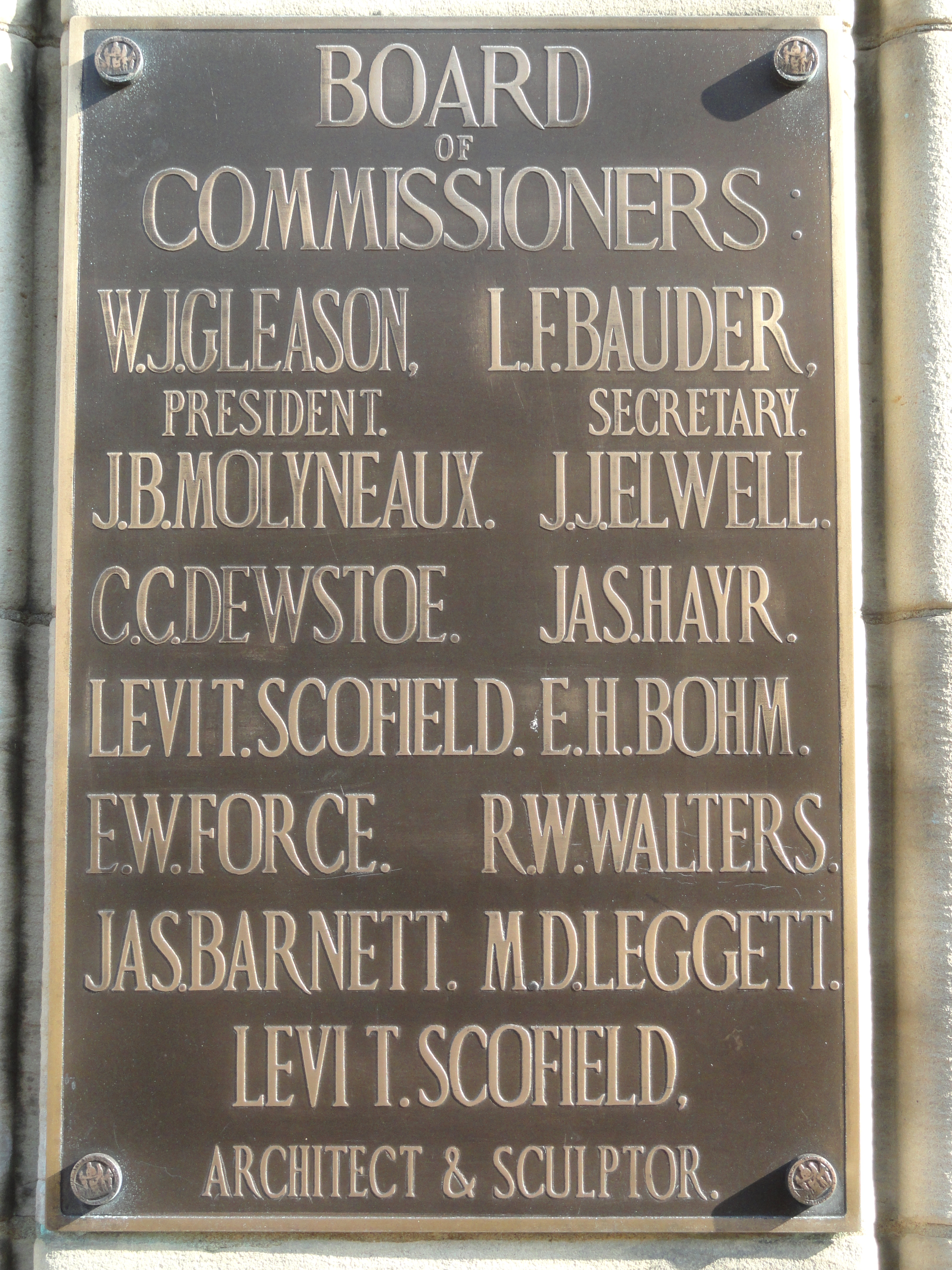
Original plaque on display near the North and South entrances of the monument.

The twelve members of this building commission were:

- William J. Gleason, President
- Levi F. Bauder, Secretary
- James Barnett
- Edward H. Bohm
- Charles Dewstoe
- J. J. Elwell
- Emory W. Force
- James Hayr
- Mortimer D. Leggett
- Joseph B. Molyneaux
- Levi T. Scofield
- R. W. Walters

=== Beginning of construction (1890–1894) ===
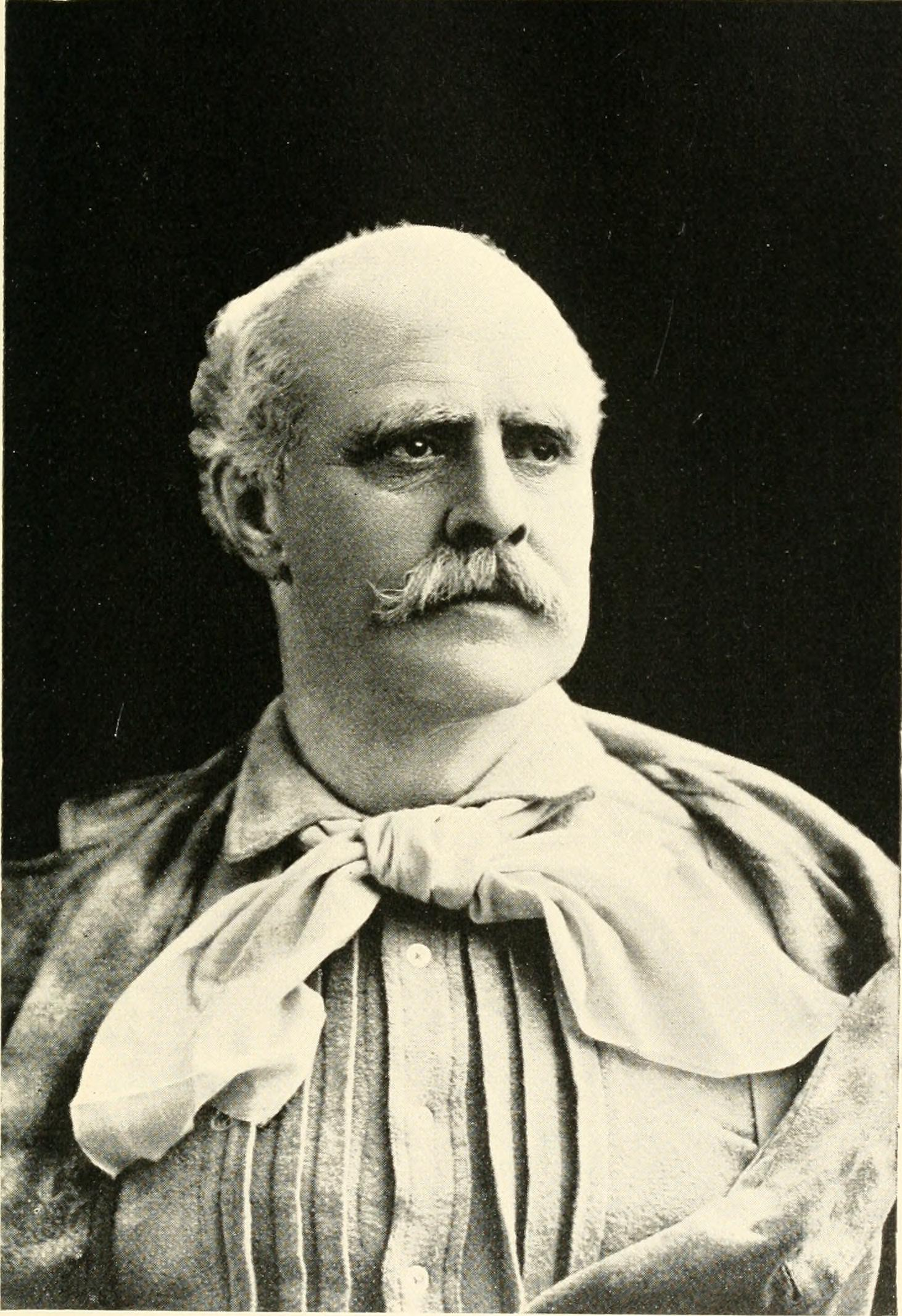
Levi T. Scofield c. 1894.

In early 1890, artists, models, and other artisans began the work of designing the proposed sculptural elements under the direction of Levi T. Scofield. Maquettes of all of the exterior statuaries as well as various architectural features were produced for review and approval by the Monument Commission. The maquettes of the exterior sculptures were exhibited at the 1893 World's Columbian Exposition in Chicago along with Scofield's sculpture entitled “These Are My Jewels” which now resides on the property of the Ohio Statehouse in Columbus. In 1975, the maquettes were donated by Douglas F. Schofield II, Levi Scofield's grandson to the citizens of Cuyahoga County, and they are currently on display in Courtroom 2 of the Cuyahoga County Courthouse.

As this work progressed, Elizabeth Scofield, the wife of Levi T. Scofield, was tasked with compiling the names of the veterans who would be honored in marble. Due to the fact that the State of Ohio did not complete its official roster of Civil War veterans until the mid-1890s, the names of those who served from the county had to be obtained manually. Using the incomplete records of the Adjutant General of the State of Ohio, Elizabeth Scofield compiled preliminary lists of eligible veterans. From 1889 to 1891, the Commission produced copies of these lists to be disseminated to Civil War veterans and Grand Army of the Republic posts for corrections and verification. With this process complete, work on producing the marble tablets for the memorial room, made from Amherst sandstone, was begun in the latter half of 1891.

The Monument Commission, wishing to break ground prior to March 1891, requested that the Cleveland Board of Park Commissioners remove the Commodore Oliver Hazard Perry statue, which sat on the site, pursuant to the act passed by the Ohio State Legislature granting them authority over the Southeast quadrant. These efforts were stonewalled by the city while various interests attempted to persuade the Monument Commissioners to relocate the structure elsewhere.

An injunction was filed by the Monument Commission against the City of Cleveland on April 15, 1891, in the Court of Common Pleas demanding relief from the Board of Park Commissioners's efforts to stymie construction. Judge Samuel E. Williamson joined in this suit on the side of the Park Commissioners alleging damages to the value of his nearby property which would result from the presence of the monument. His attorneys were Judge W. W. Boynton, Director and Attorney of the East Cleveland Street Railway Corporation, and Messrs. Estep, Dickey, Carr & Goff. The Court ruled against the Monument Commission. The Commissioners, who referred to this loss as their “Bull Run,” immediately filed an appeal to the Supreme Court of Ohio.

Gleason et al. v. Cleveland was decided on June 21, 1892. Relying on the language of the original charter for Public Square from the Connecticut Land Company, it was deemed that the Monument Commission did not need permission from the city government to commence construction. This established the Monument Commission's control over the Southeast Quadrant. The circuit court judgment was reversed and the Monument Commission was given the authority to commence construction. Gleason wrote, “Our Gettysburg had been fought and won!” This cost the taxpayers $2,900 in legal fees.

The city again offered any of the other three quadrants of the square to the commission on the basis that obstructing Euclid Avenue may not be desirable considering the city's rapid growth and potential future traffic issues. Other alternative locations presented included Lake View Cemetery, Wade Park, and the corner of Erie and Summit Streets which is approximately the location of modern-day Willard Park. The commission maintained that the Southeast quadrant was the only suitable and appropriate location for the yet unbuilt monument, although they continued to consider other options.

A last-ditch legal action was taken by the city to stymie the construction of the monument in late September 1892. An injunction was requested by the city to the United States Circuit Court. In October, the judges in the case determined that the decision of the Ohio Supreme Court was binding and that the authority granted by the State Legislature to the Monument Commission was in keeping with the original land grant which stipulated that Public Square be preserved for “public use.” With this decision, the legal options to prevent the construction of the monument on the Southeast quadrant of Public Square had been fully exhausted.

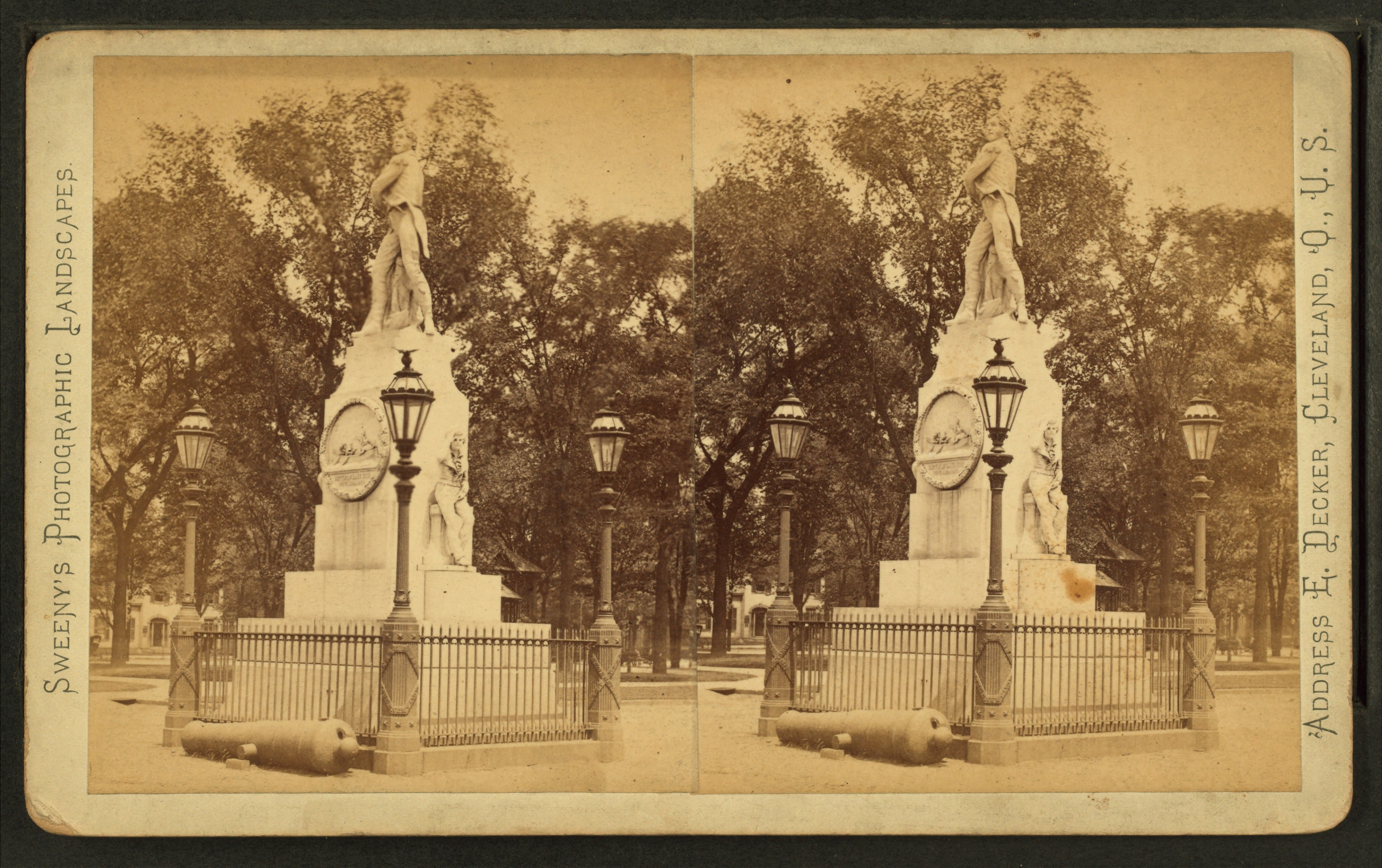
Stereoscopic image of Oliver Hazard Perry Statue likely between 1880 and 1890.

On December 2, 1892, Scofield supervised the removal of the Commodore Oliver Hazard Perry Monument and turned it over to city officials whereupon it was relocated to Wade Park. While the city had estimated the moving cost at $300–$500 and pled a lack of funds, the Commission paid only $89.00 for its removal. Likewise, the city had projected the cost of relocating the water pipe at between $2,000–$5,000 and the time to complete the work at five weeks. In the spring of 1893, a new city administration headed by Robert Blee, who supported the construction of the monument, finished the job in four days for a cost of $1,248.68. The Commissioners boasted that it cost far less and happened far quicker than the city had been claiming. Work on the construction of the monument began in earnest in the Spring of 1893 and continued throughout the entire year. By the time the monument was completed, over $272,800 had been spent on its construction which equates to over $7,000,000 today, adjusted for inflation.

=== Dedication (1894) ===
On July 4, 1894, the Cuyahoga County Soldiers’ and Sailors’ Monument was dedicated on the Southeast quadrant of Public Square. The event was attended by a star-studded list of prominent persons and was begun with a one-hundred gun salute. Former Ohio governor Joseph Foraker spoke at the event. As did Civil War veteran, current Ohio governor, and future president William McKinley. Despite rain throughout the day, thousands of Army and Navy veterans, representatives from the Grand Army of the Republic, City and fraternal organizations, dignitaries, clergymen, school choirs, and bandsmen assembled for a patriotic extravaganza.

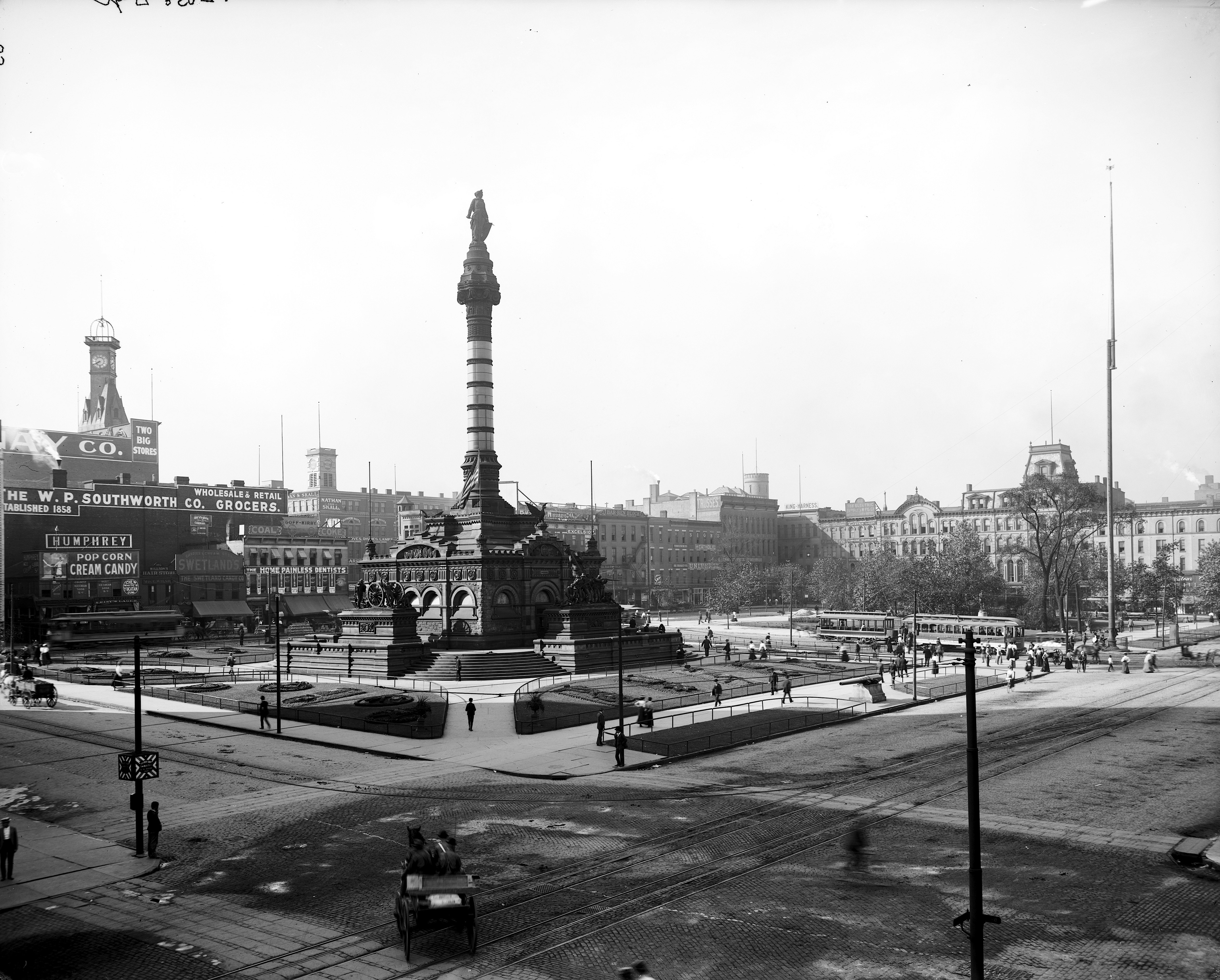
The Soldiers' and Sailors' Monument c. 1900.

=== 1896–1970 ===
In the succeeding decades, the Soldiers’ and Sailors’ Monument was host to numerous high-profile events. It was a focal point during the 1896 celebration of the centennial anniversary of the founding of Cleveland. A large temporary arch was constructed partially on the Southeast quadrant for the event.

In September 1901, 36 years after the conclusion of the Civil War, Cleveland hosted the 35th National Encampment of the Grand Army of the Republic. This was the second time Cleveland hosted the National Encampment, the first being the 6th National Encampment which occurred between May 8 and 9, 1872. The 1901 event saw over 293,000 people travel to Cleveland. President William McKinley – who spoke at the dedication of the monument – was slated to speak at the event upon his return from the Pan-American Exposition occurring in Buffalo, New York. The lavish event was stymied when news of the president's assassination and subsequent death a few days later sent the nation into shock. The monument as well as much of downtown Cleveland was adorned with dark cloth and solemn expressions of mourning.

With the turn of the century, the monument remained extremely popular with veterans and many Cuyahoga County residents. However, its location on Public Square and the uniqueness of its architecture again became the subject of criticism. In 1930, a plan to beautify Erie Street Cemetery recommended moving the monument to the cemetery and subjecting it to an extensive restoration. Although this plan was not undertaken, the structure received its first cleaning in 1932. In 1943, a proposal to construct an extensive subway system with a large central station beneath Public Square threatened the monument's position on Public Square. However, this plan was not pursued. A formal cleaning was again undertaken in 1946.

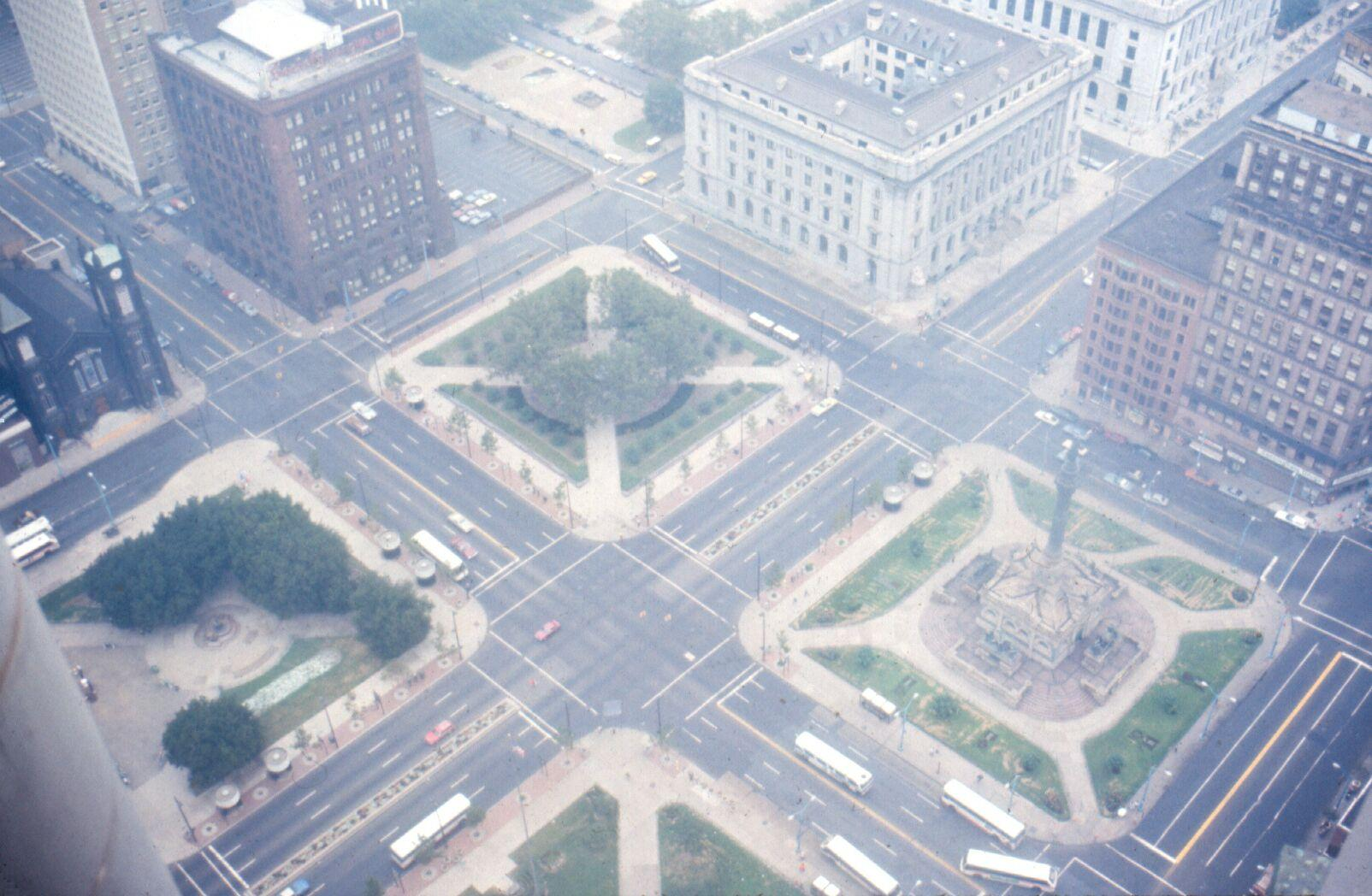
Public Square and the Soldiers' and Sailors' Monument as it appeared in 1985, prior to the 1988 redesign of the gardens.

From August 10–14, 1947, Cleveland hosted the 81st National Encampment of the Grand Army of the Republic. However, this event was considerably smaller than the event in 1901 as the Grand Army of the Republic only had 66 remaining members, most of whom were well into their ninth decade of life.

In 1959, a downtown master plan revived the idea of constructing a subway station beneath the square. This would have required the monument to be relocated to the Northwest quadrant. During this period, a solution of acid was used to clean the walls of the monument, inadvertently stripping the original colors that had been painted on the stone, leaving the interior seriously altered. It would remain this way for over half a century.

The political turmoil of the 1960s and 1970s brought forth a spate of stylistic and ideological opposition to the monument. Plans to modernize Public Square were proposed throughout this period, most including the removal of the monument. The monument was the scene of protests and demonstrations during the Vietnam War.

=== Restoration and centennial (1980–2000) ===
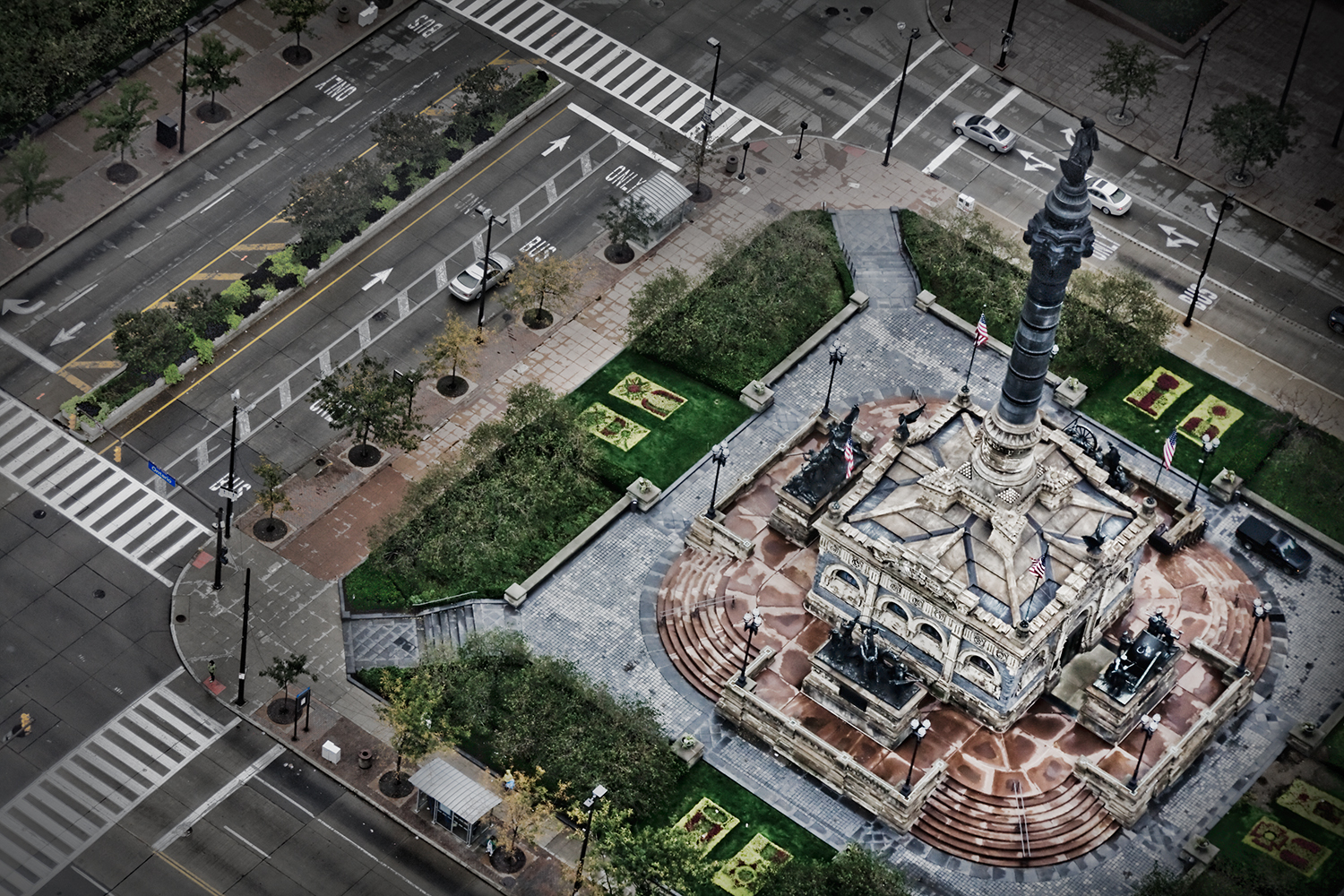
The Southeast quadrant after the 1988 redesign and before the extensive 2015-2016 renovation of Public Square.

The explosive demolition of the Cuyahoga and Williamson Buildings in 1982, in order to allow for the construction of the Sohio Building, left the nearly 90 year old monument and her statuaries covered in dust. County architect Berj Shakarian reported in 1983 that over $150,000 would be needed for structural repairs to the monument. As more issues were discovered, the total price tag for these repairs were increased to more than $512,000. Shakarian remained involved with the monument. In 1988, he led the extensive redesign of the southeast quadrant. Shakarian became a trustee of the monument in 2011.

The monument's centennial was celebrated on 2 July 1994 with a large ceremony. Prominent Civil War historian James McPherson spoke at the event. Ohio Governor George V. Voinovich also attended the ceremony.

=== Extensive renovation (2008–2010) ===
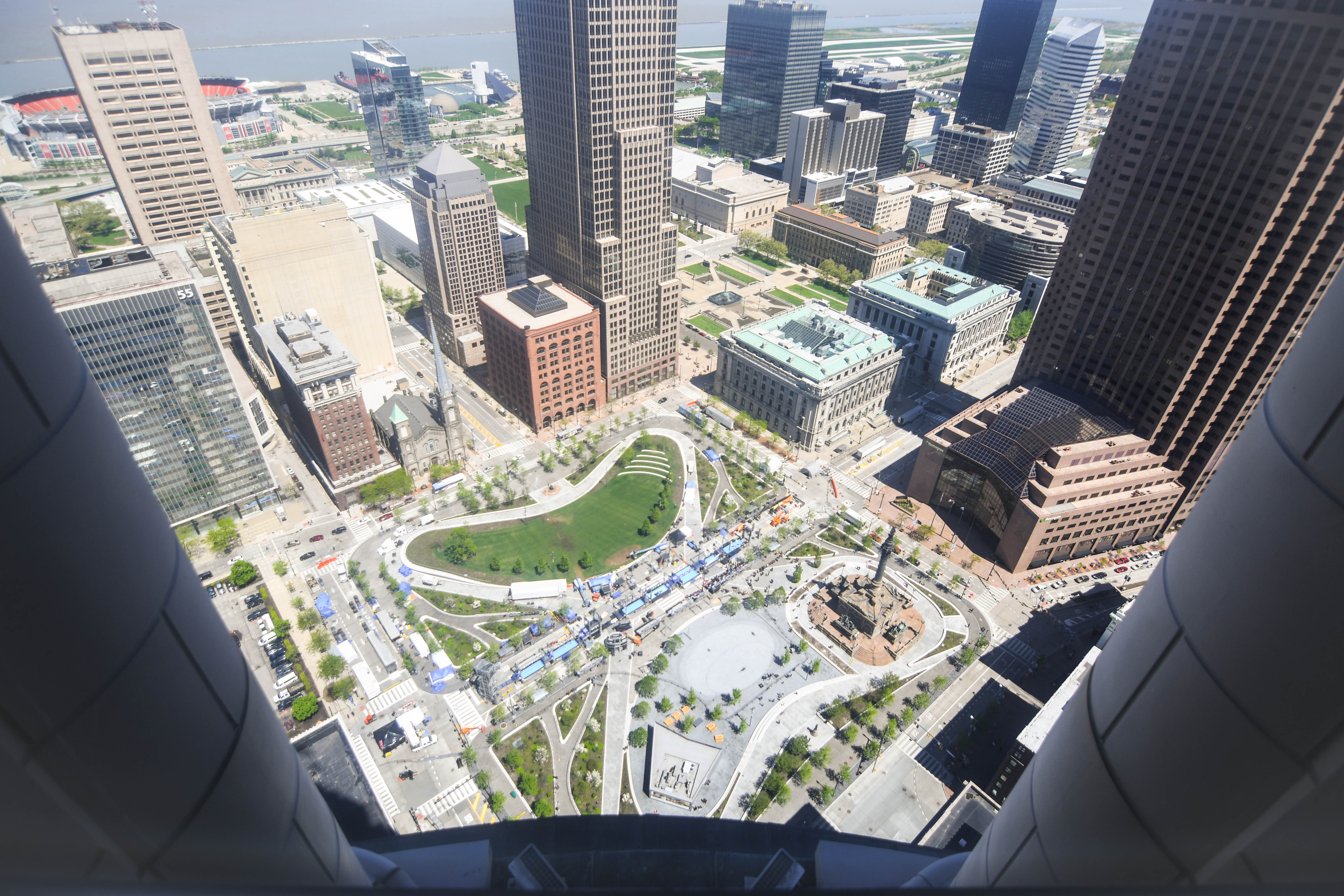
Redesign of Public Square showing the course set up for American Ninja Warrior which was filmed just outside the Soldiers' and Sailors' Monument in 2017.

By 2008, the now 114-year-old structure had begun to show its age. In 2006, the Cuyahoga County Commissioners had recommended a modest $1,000,000 restoration of the structure. However, after further investigation of the needs of the monument, it was determined that $2,000,000 would be needed to complete the project. Under the direction of then Monument Commission President Neil K. Evans, this money was raised from federal, state, and county sources as well as from local corporations, foundations, businesses, veterans’ groups, and private individuals. Work on restoring the original colorization of the interior was assisted by individuals from the Cleveland Museum of Art and the Cleveland Museum of Natural History. These efforts were widely praised at the time. The monument was reopened in December 2009 and officially rededicated on June 5, 2010, with a large ceremony. Today, visitors can step inside the monument and experience it as it was intended back in 1894.

=== Since 2010 ===
In 2011, researchers discovered that the names of 140 black soldiers from the area were omitted from the tablets. On June 19, 2019, after more than a decade of extensive research, 107 members of the United States Colored Troops were officially added to the monument's Roll of Honor with a formal ceremony.

In 2015, the $32,000,000 proposed renovation of Public Square would result in major changes to the area surrounding the monument. This included revising the four-quadrant, New England–style design originally platted by Moses Cleaveland in 1796. Construction began in March 2015 and was completed officially on June 30, 2016, with the rededication of Public Square.

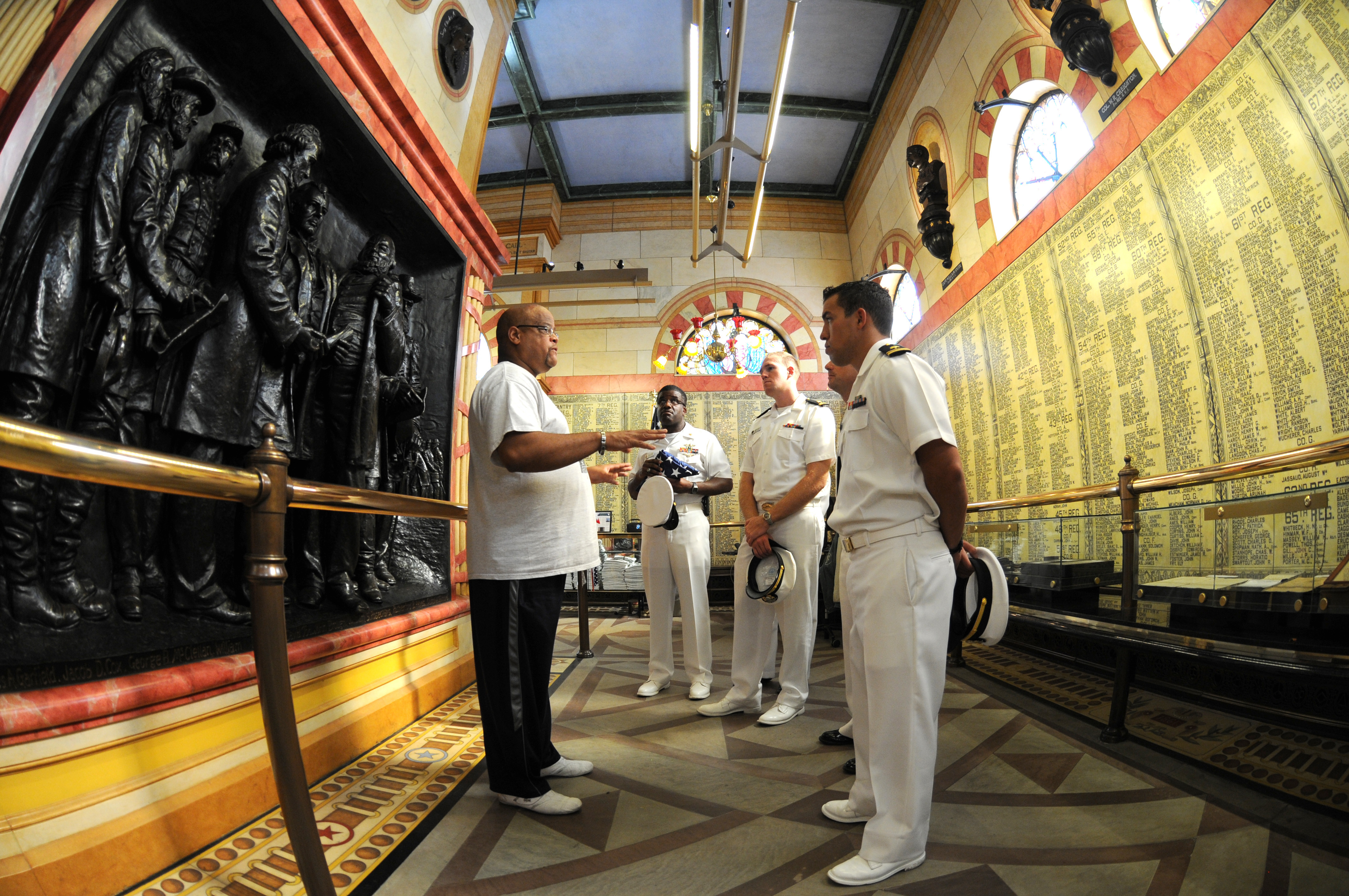
Sailors from the guided-missile submarine USS Ohio (SSGN-726) tour the monument with retired Navy submariner Timothy Leslie during Cleveland Navy Week in 2010.

During the 2016 Republican National Convention which was held in Cleveland, the Public Square and the monument were the scene of numerous demonstrations.

In 2017, the television show American Ninja Warrior was filmed on the newly redesigned Public Square, just outside the Soldiers' and Sailors' Monument.

On July 4, 2019, the 125th anniversary of the dedication of the monument was celebrated with a ceremony on Public Square. The keynote address was delivered by Major General John C. Harris Jr., adjutant general of the Ohio Army National Guard.

The monument remains a popular attraction both for tourists and local residents. Free to visit, around 40,000 visitors pass through the tablet room each year.

== Exterior design ==
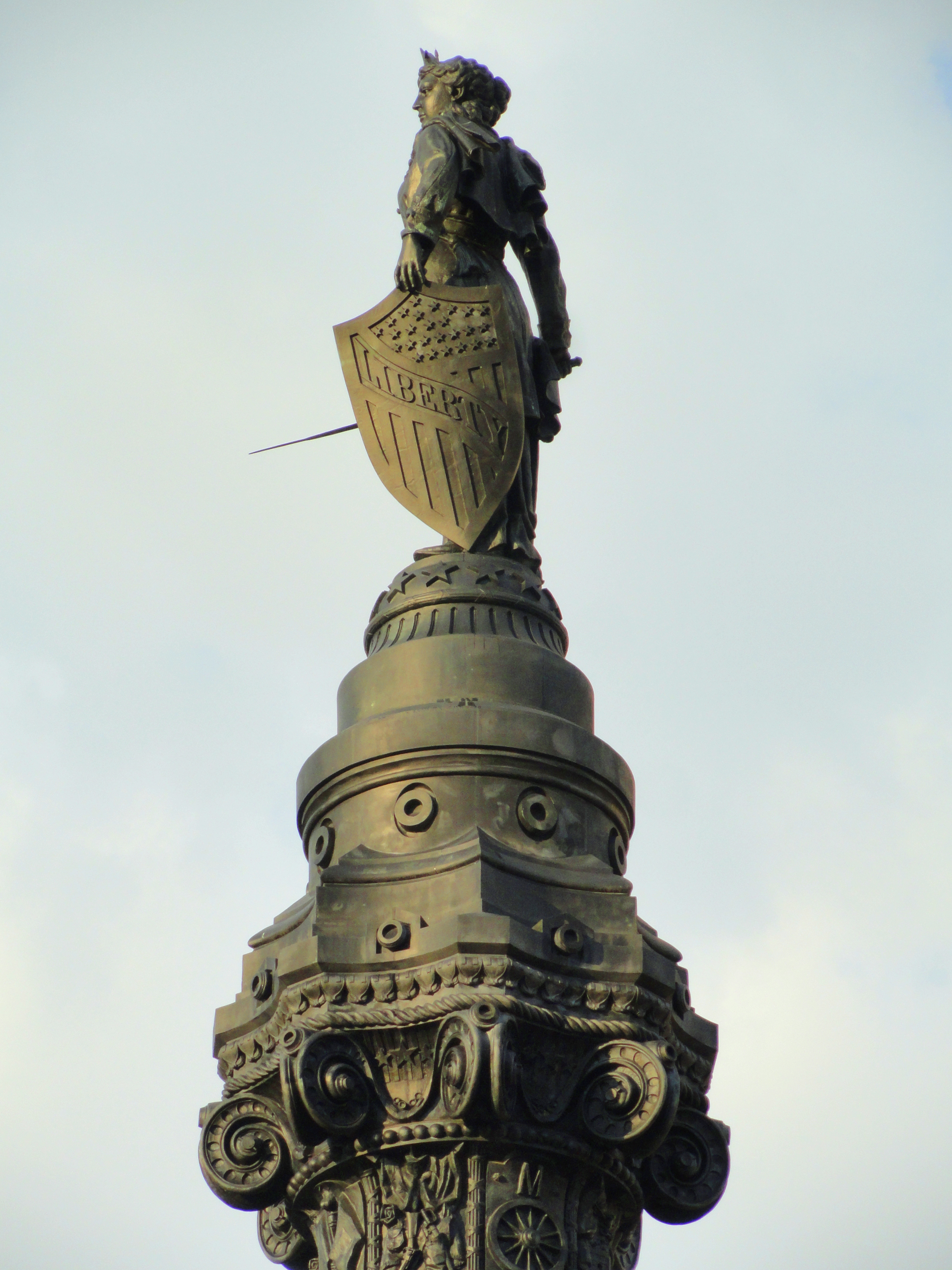
Figure of liberty and the ornate capital on which she stands.

=== Architecture ===
The monument serves as a unique example of late 19th century architecture. Architect Levi Scofield wished to create a structure that incorporated traditional architectural elements infused with militaristic imagery and symbolism. For example, the supports beneath the arched windows depict upturned cannons, while the edges of the columns running up the length of the building depict ramrods topped with capitals fashioned out of ammunition pouches.

The central shaft is composed of Quincey granite and is 125-foot (38 m) tall capped with a 15-foot (4.6 m) personification of liberty. The figure, which is wearing a military frock coat and holding a sword and a shield, is oriented northward. The capital of the shaft features militaristic imagery and the bands that wrap around the mid-portion of the shaft have inscribed on them the names of major battles of the Civil War.

The four flag poles that anchor the corners of the building are set in embellishments meant to resemble stacked cannonballs. Large bronze eagles sit above the north and south doors. Along the top of the structure, the corps badge emblems are carved in stone. These designs are reflected in the yearly flower displays which have been a tradition since 1894.

There is a United States Geological Survey marker installed on the Northwest side of the esplanade. The benchmark was likely placed around the turn of the century and indicates an elevation of 668 feet above sea level.

=== Landscaping ===
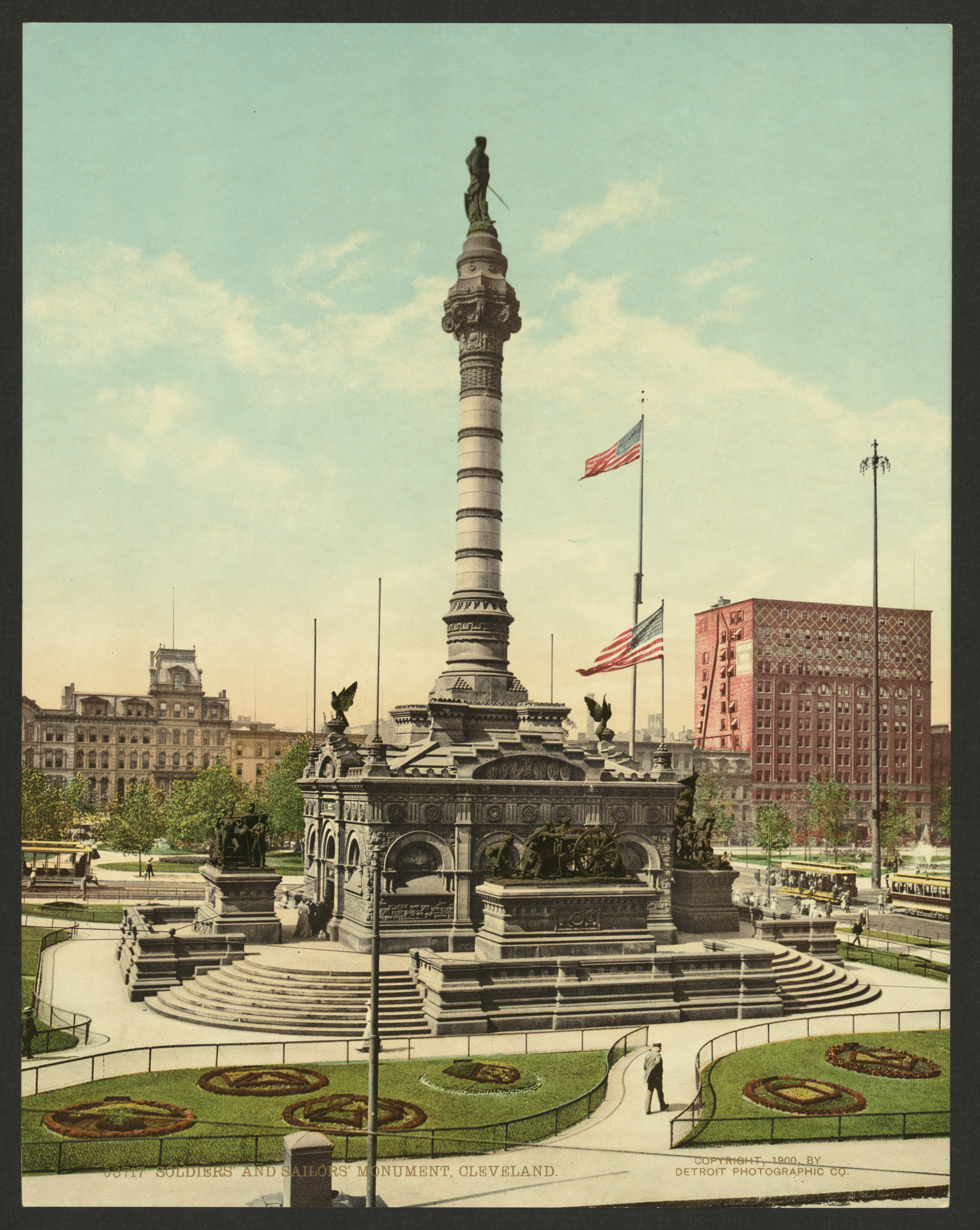
Photomechanical print c.1900 showing the original design of the landscaping, featuring the corps badges.

As part of the original designs of the Soldiers’ and Sailors’ Monument, the flower beds surrounding the structure were decorated with the insignias of the corps badges used throughout the Civil War, as well as various other military imagery. These designs were maintained in some form for much of the history of the structure until the 1988 redesign of the southeast quadrant which changed the layout and position of the gardens. The more modern shape of the gardens that came out of the redesign of Public Square in 2016 resulted in additional changes to the exterior landscaping. While the corps badge insignias are still included in the designs of the North and West beds, the South and East beds now incorporate other designs such as a G.A.R. badge, a patriotic swoosh, and an anchor.

=== Statuary Groupings ===
The upper esplanade is made of red Medina sandstone and features four large bronze statuary groupings: Mortar Practice, At Short Range, The Color Guard, and the Advanced Guard. The bronze statuary groupings stand atop Berea sandstone pedestals and depict scenes featuring the four branches of the armed forces at the time of the Civil War.

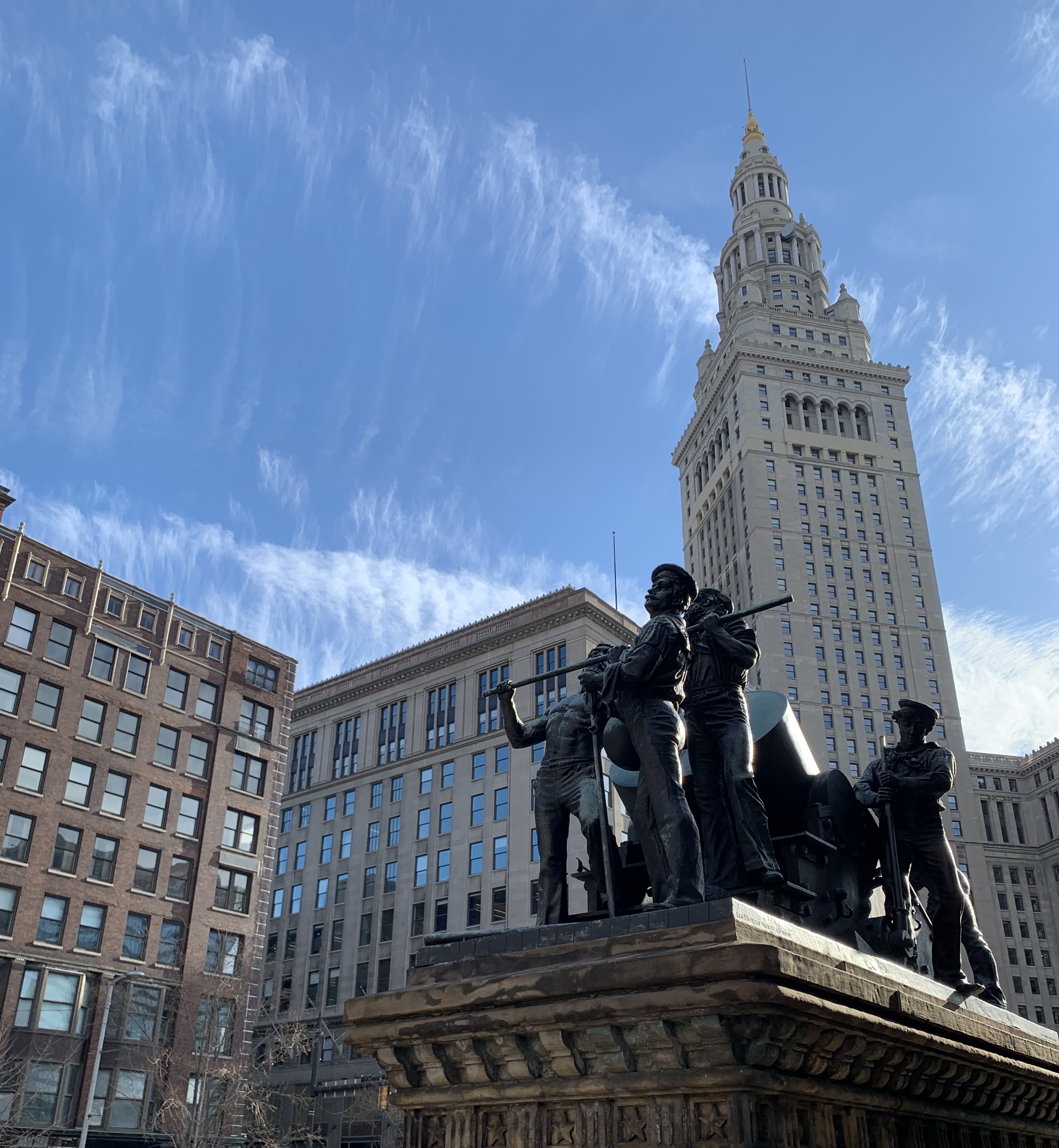
At Short Range, with Terminal Tower in the background

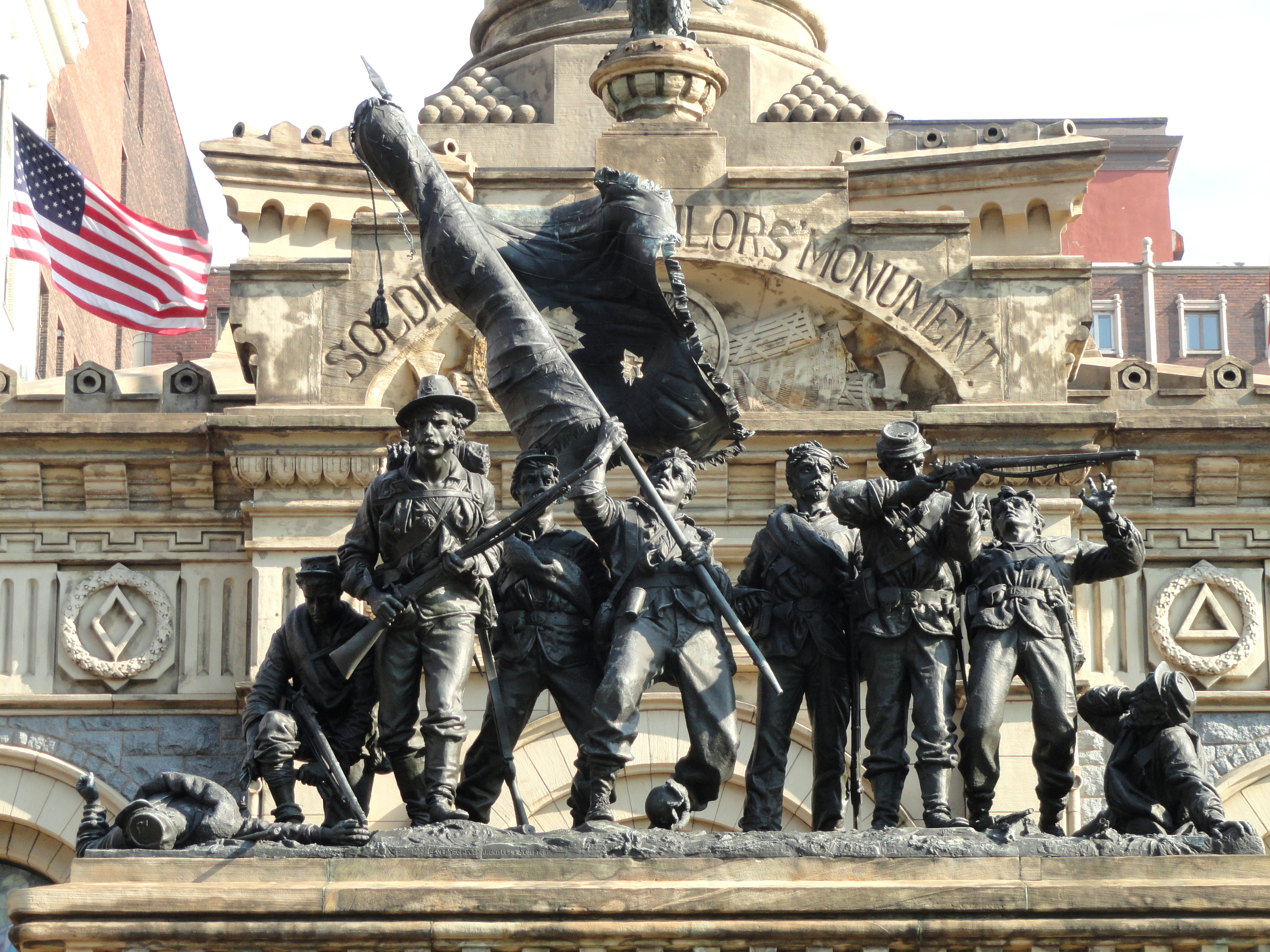
The Color Guard.

==== Mortar Practice ====
Mortar Practice honors the Navy and features no casualties. It depicts a scene near Island No. 10 on the Mississippi River, where an officer and five men are loading a mortar, in preparation for the shelling of entrenchments.

==== At Short Range ====
At Short Range honors the Artillery. An officer is seen attempting to aim a cannon, unaware that two of his men have fallen.

==== The Color Guard ====
The Color Guard honors the Infantry and is the only statuary that depicts a known battle. Levi T. Scofield, who served in the 103rd Ohio Volunteer Infantry Regiment, chose to depict the 103rd engaged in the Battle of Resaca, Georgia. This was largely considered to be a Union defeat and the grouping is Scofield's memorial to his regiment and the men lost in the battle. Every figure in this grouping has been killed or wounded.

==== The Advanced Guard ====
The Advanced Guard honors the Cavalry. It depicts a Union detachment that has encountered enemy troops. A Union trooper, still astride his injured horse, is seen firing his pistol at an enemy soldier at point blank range. Another Union soldier is seen aiming his carbine southward. A bugler stands at the edge of the scene, summoning help for the embattled Union soldiers.

== Interior design ==
=== Overview ===
The interior of the monument is designed to serve as a memorial tablet room. It features marble tablets along the outer walls on which the names of the veterans from Cuyahoga County are engraved. The inner walls, which surround the base of the large granite shaft, feature four large bronze panels. The bronze panels include life-size depictions of allegorical scenes relating to the Civil War. Above the bronze panels on the inner walls are a series of medallions which depict notable military figures from throughout the Civil War. Above the memorial tablets on the outer walls sit a series of busts which depict notable individuals from Cuyahoga County who died as a result of their service.

=== Stained Glass Windows ===
There are 14 stained glass windows which sit above the memorial tablets. Designed by a local glassworks known as H.W. Lewis & Co., they depict the arms and accoutrements of the various branches of the military corresponding to the statuary grouping outside. During the 2008 renovation, they were removed and re-leaded. This work was undertaken by Whitney Stained Glass Studios.

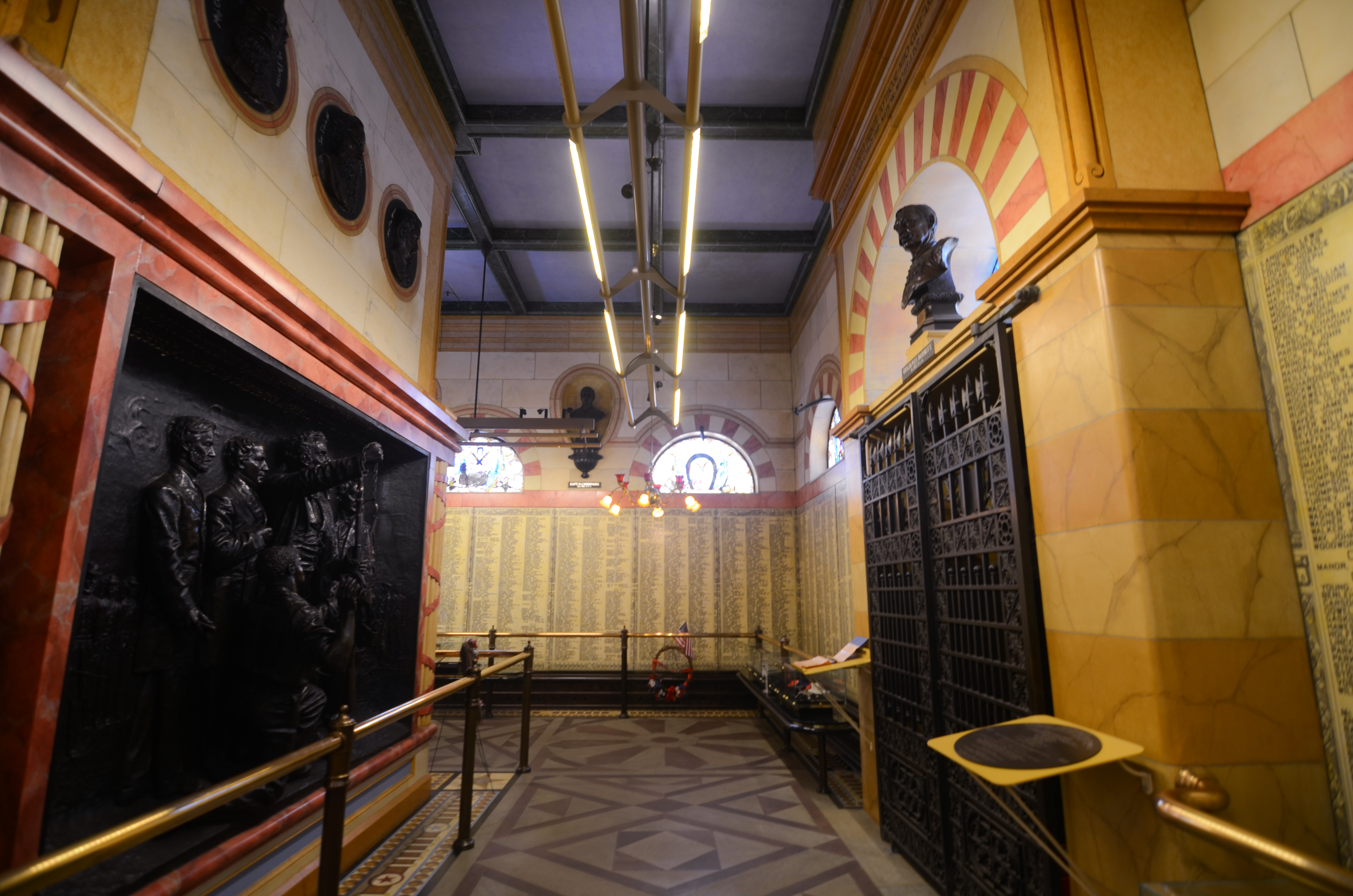
North side of the monument.

=== Bronze Panels ===
==== The Northern Ohio Soldiers’ Aid Society and Sanitary Commission ====
Upon entering the South doors, the first panel one will encounter honors the Northern Ohio Soldiers’ Aid Society & Sanitary Commission. Begun in April 1861, shortly after the firing of Fort Sumter, the Soldiers’ Aid Society provided support both for soldiers stationed at the many nearby camps, as well to the local families of soldiers who had left to fight on behalf of the Union. The Soldiers’ Aid Society became a branch of the United States Sanitary Commission, a national organization mostly of women that supported the soldiers of the Union Army by providing supplies, medical expertise, and other services such as soldiers’ homes. Despite being a smaller branch compared to other parts of the Union, the women of the Northern Ohio Sanitary Commission raised nearly $1,000,000 worth of supplies to support the Union soldiers. Recognizing the efforts of women in this manner was progressive for the time.

This panel features life-sized figures of individuals including Rebecca Cromwell Rouse, a leading social-services organizer and reformer; Lucy Webb Hayes, first-lady of the United States; as well as a Catholic nun, believed to be a Sister of Charity who is seen dressing the arm of a wounded man.

Individuals Depicted (left to right, names as they appear): Mrs. John Shelly, Miss Ellen Terry, Mrs. W.M. Melhinch, Mrs. Benjamin Rouse, Miss Sara Mahan, Miss Mary C. Brayton, Mrs. J.A. Harris, Mrs. Rutherford B. Hayes, and Mrs. Peter Thatcher, Unidentified Catholic Nun.

==== The Beginning of the War in Ohio ====
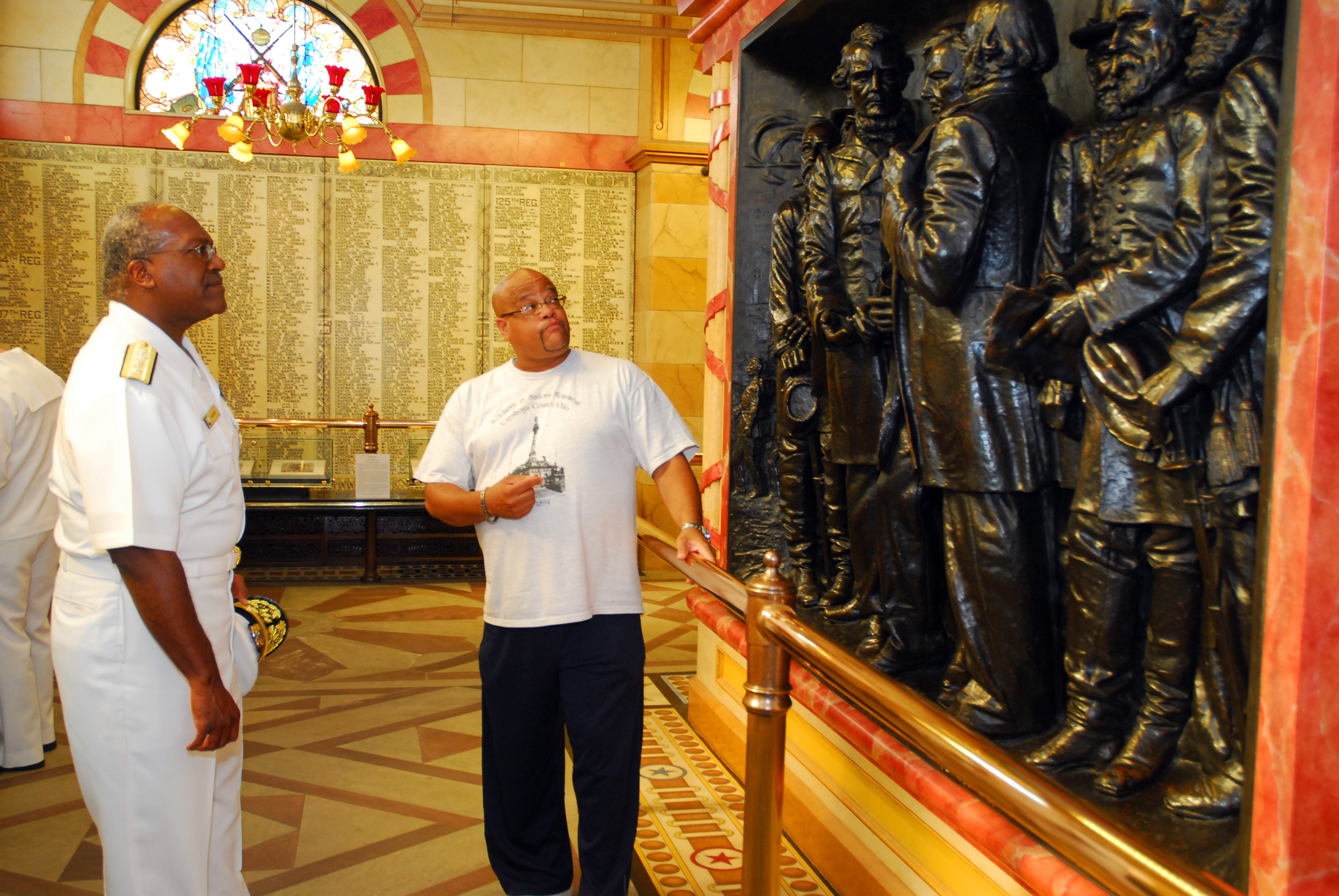
Caretaker and retired Navy submariner Timothy Leslie (right) discusses the Beginning of the War in Ohio Panel with Rear Adm. Julius S. Caesar, vice director of Joint Concept Development & Experimentation at U.S. Joint Forces Command (left), during Cleveland Navy Week in August, 2010.

Moving clockwise, the Beginning of the War panel depicts Ohio's three wartime governors, William Dennison Jr., David Tod, and John Brough in the center. Surrounding these men are major generals either from Ohio or in charge of Ohio troops. These include James A. Garfield, Jacob D. Cox, George B. McClellan, William S. Rosecrans, Rutherford B. Hayes, and Quincy A. Gilmore. In the background of the panel, there is a depiction of civilians signing up for military service on the right and, on the left, leaving for war in uniform.

Individuals Depicted: James A. Garfield, Jacob D. Cox, George B. McClellan, William Dennison, David Tod, John Brough, William S. Rosecrans, Rutherford B. Hayes, Quincy A. Gilmore.

==== The Emancipation Panel ====
This represents two important pieces of federal legislation: the Emancipation Proclamation and the creation of the United States Colored Troops. Behind Abraham Lincoln stand four major figures from Ohio who fought for emancipation: Joshua R. Giddings, Benjamin Wade, Salmon P. Chase, and John Sherman. Abraham Lincoln, who stands at the center, is seen handing a union rifle to an African-American man named Dan R. Field who is seen being sworn into the Army. The panel faces North.

Individuals Depicted: John Sherman, Salmon P. Chase, Dan R. Field, Abraham Lincoln, Benjamin F. Wade, Joshua R. Giddings.

==== The Peace-Makers at City Point ====
The Peace-Makers at City Point depicts an allegorical meeting between Abraham Lincoln and his generals and admirals discussing how the war would be brought to an end. Although not all of the men depicted in this panel were in the same place at the same time, the depiction was inspired by an actual council of war that occurred in March 1865 between President Lincoln, General Ulysses Grant, General William Sherman, and Admiral David Porter abroad the steamship called the River Queen near City Point, Virginia. At this meeting that Lincoln expressed his desire for a swift end to the war and magnanimous treatment of the rebels thereafter. General Sherman's aggressive posture in this panel represents his opposition to Lincoln's desires, favoring a much more aggressive strategy. Lincoln stands calmly, contrasting Sherman's stance while Grant stands off to the side.

The panel mirrors the well-known 1868 painting called The Peacemakers by George P. A. Healy.

Individuals Depicted: George A. Custer, Phillip H. Sheridan, George Crook, Ulysses S. Grant, John A. Rawlins, Abraham Lincoln, Robert T. Lincoln, Mortimer D. Leggett, Wm.T. Sherman, G.K. Warren, George G. Meade, E.O.C. Ord, David D. Porter, A.A. Humphreys

=== Medallions ===
The bronze medallions are affixed to the inner wall above the bronze panels and depict notable Ohioans associated with the Civil War.

==== North Wall ====
- James B. McPherson
- Edwin M. Stanton
- William Babcock Hazen

==== South Wall ====
- Alvin C. Voris
- John Johnson Elwell
- John Stephen Casement

==== East Wall ====
- Alexander McDowell McCook
- James Blair Steedman
- Manning Ferguson Force

==== West Wall ====
- Emerson Opdycke
- George Washington Morgan
- Charles A. Hartman

== Notable honorees ==
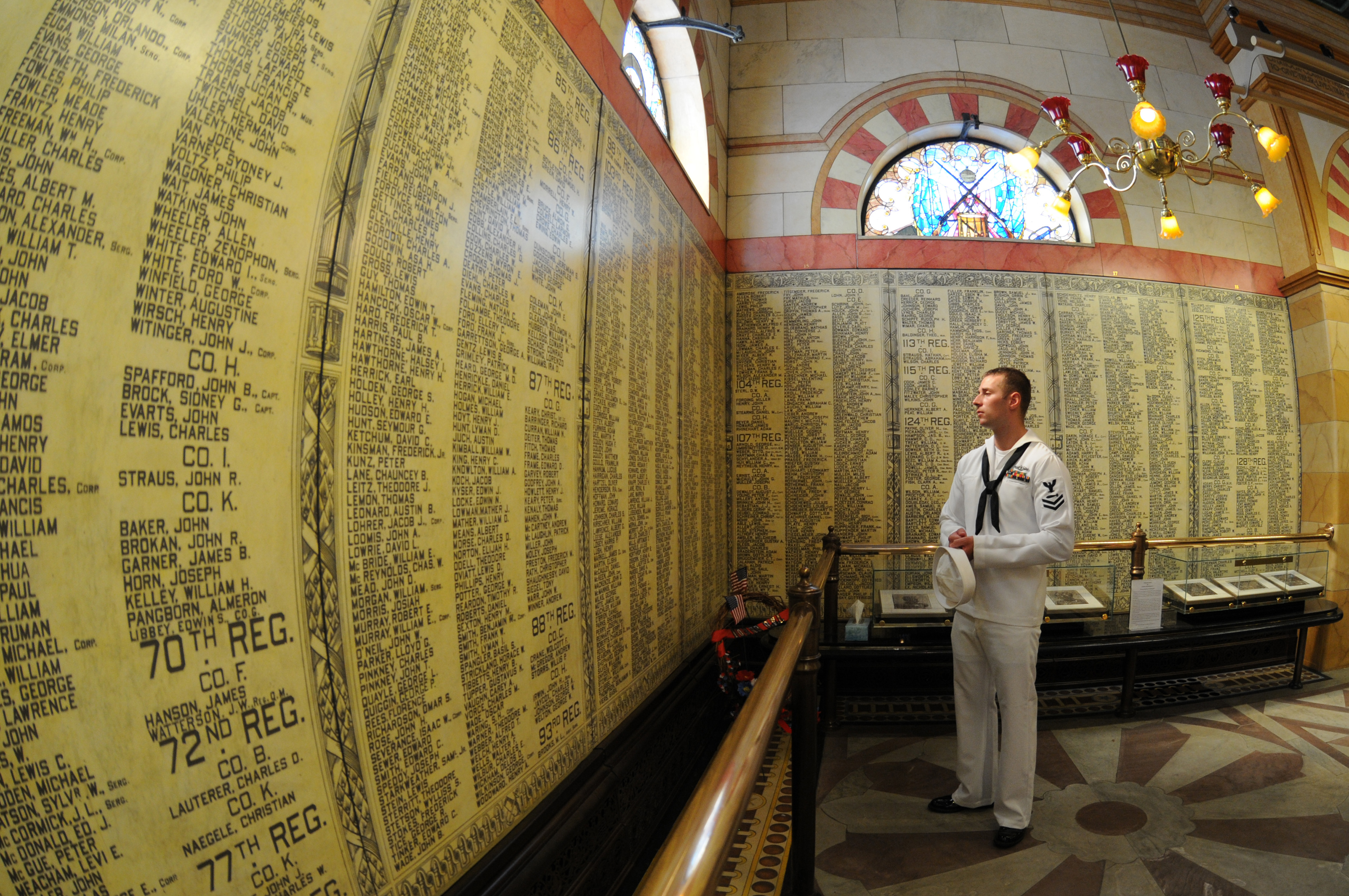
Member of the U.S. Navy studies the names of Civil War veterans engraved on the marble tablets.

=== Roll of Honor ===
- James Barnett – Highest Ranking Officer from Cuyahoga County during the Civil War, Businessman, and Philanthropist – Tablet 27, North Door Bust
- Henry D. Coffinberry – Pioneer of the Modern Great Lakes Shipping Industry, President of the American Ship Building Company – Tablet 36
- Henry Kirke Cushing – Prominent Physician, Educator, and Medical Reformer, Father of Harvey Cushing – Tablet 1
- John H. Devereaux – Civil Engineer, Prominent Railroad Executive, Original Purchaser of The Spirit of '76 in which His Son, Henry Devereaux, Modeled as the Drummer – Tablet 36
- Franz Frey – Medal of Honor Recipient for gallantry during the Siege of Vicksburg on May 22, 1863 – Tablet 6
- William Gleason – President of Soldiers’ and Sailors’ Monument Commission, Secretary of Cleveland Public Library – Tablet 21
- Marcus Alonzo Hanna – Businessman, Republican Senator from Ohio, Chairman of the Republican National Committee, and Close Advisor to President William McKinley – Tablet 20
- Charles Hartman – Cuyahoga County Coroner, Only Union Regimental Surgeon Killed in Battle – Tablet 4, West Wall Medallion
- Joseph A. Joel – Editor and Publisher of the Grand Army Gazette, Friend of Rutherford B. Hayes, Author of 1866 Article in the Jewish Messenger Detailing His Observance of Passover while in the Union Army – Tablet 4
- Simon Perkins – Ohio State Senator and Representative, Business Partner of John Brown, Son of Simon Perkins – Tablet 36
- Jay C. Morse – Co-founder of Pickands Mather & Company, Shipping Agent for Cleveland Iron Mining Company. – Tablet 20
- James S. Pickands – Co-founder of Pickands Mather & Company – Tablet 1
- Franklin Rockefeller – Businessman, co-founder of Union Sulphur Company – Tablet 2
- Levi Tucker Scofield – Prominent Architect and Sculptor, Soldiers’ and Sailors’ Monument Commissioner, First Cleveland Architect to join the American Institute of Architects, Author of The Retreat from Pulaski to Nashville – Tablet 14, South Door Bust
- Zephaniah Swift Spaulding – Appointed by President Andrew Johnson to Serve as American Consul to the Kingdom Hawaiʻi, Son of Rufus Spalding – Tablet 5
- Anson Stager – Western Union Executive, Head of the Military Telegraph Department (1861–1868) – Tablet 36
- Randall P. Wade – Businessman, Chief Clerk of Military Telegraph Operations, Son of Jeptha Homer Wade, Father of Jeptha Homer Wade II – Tablet 36
- Charles Whittlesey – Geologist, co-founder and President of the Western Reserve Historical Society – Tablet 4
- Edward P. Williams – Co-founder of Sherwin-Williams – Tablet 12

=== Soldiers' Aid Society of Northern Ohio ===
- Mary Clark Brayton – Secretary of Cleveland Soldiers' Aid Society, Co-Author of Our Acre and Its Harvest, Co-Organizer of Northern Ohio Sanitary Fair
- Rebecca Cromwell Rouse – Philanthropist, Reformer, Founder of the First Baptist Church of Greater Cleveland, The Cleveland Ladies Temperance Union, and the Protestant Orphan Asylum, Organizer of the Cleveland Soldiers’ Aid Society
- Ellen F. Terry – Treasurer of Cleveland Soldiers' Aid Society, Co-Author of Our Acre and Its Harvest, Co-Organizer of Northern Ohio Sanitary Fair

== See also ==
- History of Cleveland
- Cleveland in the American Civil War
- Ohio in the American Civil War
