= Shirla R. McClain =

American historian

- Born: Shirla Lorraine Robinson; February 4, 1935; Akron, Ohio
- Died: May 31, 1997 (aged 62); Akron, Ohio
- Monuments: Dr. Shirla R. McClain Gallery of Akron's Black History and Culture
- Education: BA, MA, Ph.D. in Education
- Alma mater: University of Akron
- Occupation: Professor
- Employer(s): University of Akron; Kent State University; Akron Public Schools
- Notable work: The Contributions of Blacks in Akron, 1825-1975

Shirla Lorraine Robinson McClain, Ph.D. (February 4, 1935 – May 31, 1997) is an American educator. Dr. McClain is best known for her doctoral dissertation on the history of African Americans in Akron. The dissertation was the first comprehensive history of African–Americans in Akron. While she planned to have her dissertation commercially published, she was unable to see this desire come to pass prior to her death in 1997. The work has been posthumously published online through a joint effort of the McClain family, the University of Akron, and the Akron-Summit County Public Library. She was a native of Akron, Ohio.

== Personal background ==
Shirla Lorraine Robinson was born in 1935 in Akron, Ohio to Dumas and Marcella (née Macbeth) Robinson. She had four siblings, including brothers Dumas and Duane, and sisters Sheila and Faith. She married Henry McClain on April 6, 1957. Together, they had two children, Kelli and Scott.

She attended the University of Akron, from where she received her Bachelor's and Master's degree, as well as her doctorate in education in 1956, 1970, and 1975, respectively. After earning her bachelor's degree, she taught elementary and secondary education for the first part of her career, additionally serving as a supervisor in the Akron Public School system.

== Professional background ==
After earning her Ph.D. in 1975, McClain joined the faculty of Kent State University in the College of Education, where she taught elementary and secondary education through 1987. She additionally served as a professor of education and assistant director of teacher preparation at Walsh University in Canton, Ohio.

During her career, McClain published over 15 articles and 45 academic papers. In 1994, she was honored with the University of Akron's Alumni Honor Award for Excellence in Professional Achievement in 1994.

== Dr. Shirla R. McClain Gallery ==
McClain was instrumental in the formation of Akron's Black History Gallery at the University of Akron. The gallery was inspired by her dissertation, The Contribution of Blacks in Akron's History: 1825–1975. The development of the gallery began to take root, through a collaborative effort by the Summit County Historical Society's plan to establish the John Brown Institute of Black History and a history project of Alpha Kappa Alpha sorority.

In 1985, individuals living in the Akron area began expressing a desire to establish a Black Cultural Center. In 1991, the government officials established a Presidential Blue Ribbon Task Force composed of community leaders, students, faculty, and administrators, chaired by former State Representative Vernon Sykes. In 1992, following research and feasibility studies, the Task Force submitted a report calling for the city to establish a cultural diversity center, which would present the history of African-Americans from Akron, to include a gallery and historical repository.

In 1994, the Gallery of Akron's Black History opened at The University of Akron. McClain and Attorney Edward Gilbert served as co-chairs of the gallery's endowment campaign. The gallery's steering Committee, along with McClain, collected artifacts and historical documents and opened the gallery's first exhibit, "Blacks in Education" in 1997.

While working to prepare for the gallery's second exhibit, McClain succumbed to a long battle with cancer. On January 10, 1998, in honor of her work, the gallery was renamed and rededicated as the Dr. Shirla R. McClain Gallery of Akron's Black History and Culture.
