= Colonel Simon Perkins =

American politician

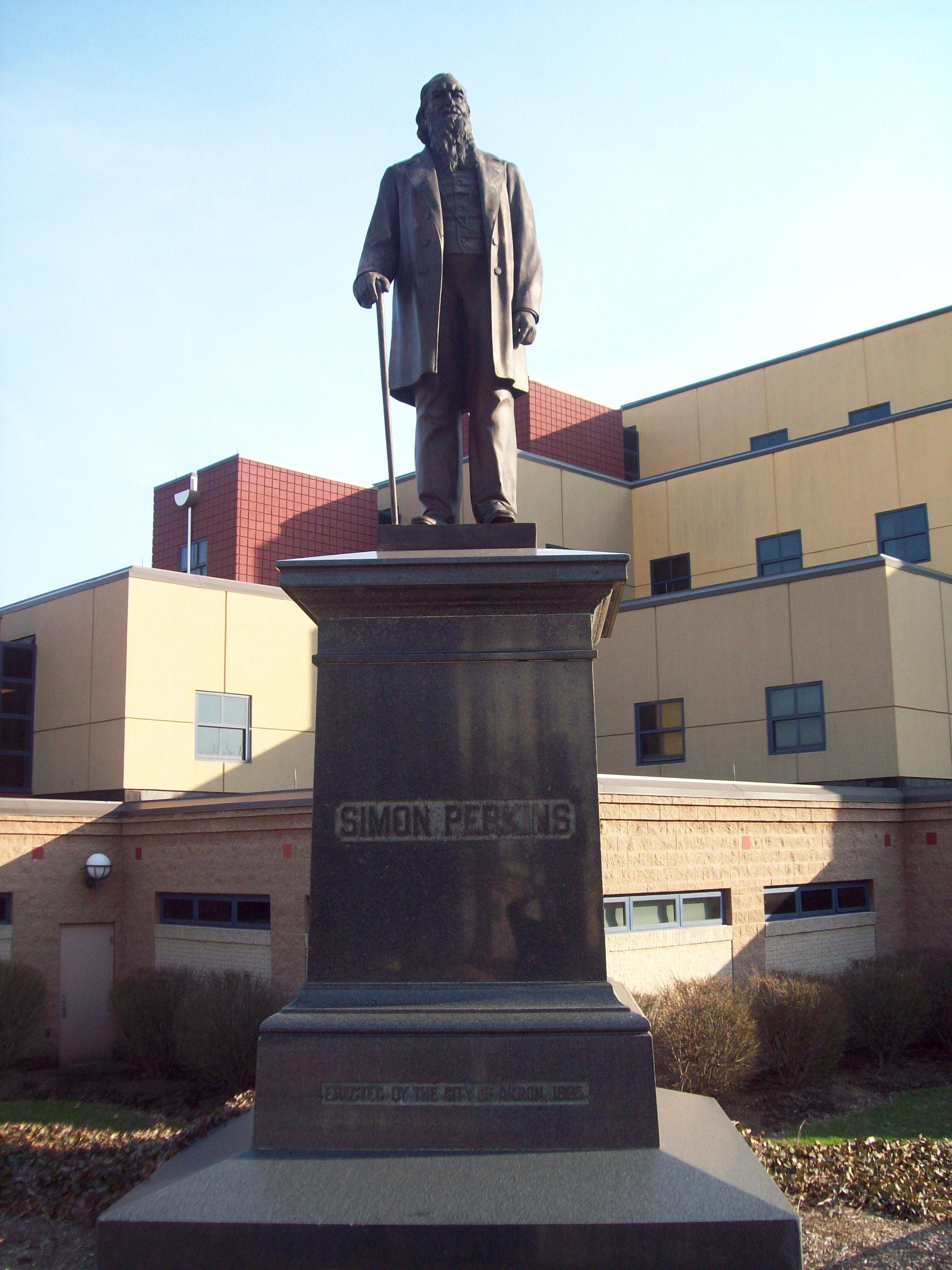
Statue of Colonel Simon Perkins in Akron

"Colonel" Simon Perkins (1805–1887) was an American businessman, farmer, state senator, and entrepreneur. He was born in Warren, Ohio, in 1805, but spent most of his life in Akron, Ohio. He was the oldest son of Simon Perkins, the founder of the City of Akron. The title "Colonel" was honorary; no records exist that show he served in the military.

== Biography ==
Colonel Simon Perkins was born on February 6, 1805, in Warren, Ohio, to General Simon Perkins and Nancy Ann Bishop Perkins. His first position was with his father's land company in Warren. He married Grace Ingersoll Tod of Youngstown, Ohio, on November 23, 1833. Two years later, he and his wife and baby daughter, Anna, moved to Akron, Ohio, in order to oversee his father's business affairs. Their first home was a small wooden frame house located along the Portage Path of Summit County, Ohio. John Brown (abolitionist) would later rent this building, known as the John Brown House (Akron, Ohio) from Perkins during their business partnership.

Construction began immediately on the Perkins Stone Mansion in 1835, and it was completed in 1837. The family moved in that spring. Perkins was mainly interested in agriculture, sheep, and livestock and therefore turned his property on Perkins Hill into a large farm. He imported the best breeds of sheep to his farm and eventually hired John Brown (abolitionist) to oversee them. Their firm was known as Perkins & Brown. The business eventually failed and Perkins absorbed most of the loss.

Colonel Perkins encouraged the Akron Branch of the Cleveland & Pittsburgh Railroad (C.A. & C. Railroad) which was completed in 1852. He served as the president from 1851 to 1864 and as general superintendent until 1869. He also backed the Atlantic & Great Western Railroad, but his net losses from the project kept him in significant debt for many years.

He served in the Ohio State Senate from 1839 to 1840 and was the first representative for the newly formed Summit County from 1841 to 1842. He was one of the most prominent promoters of the new county. He also served as trustee for Portage Township. He was also one of the organizers of the Akron Rural Cemetery (Glendale) and served as president from 1839 to 1880. He also donated property for the founding of two Akron city parks, Union and Grace (which was named for his wife.)

Grace Tod died on April 6, 1867, and Colonel Perkins died July 21, 1887.

The family home, Perkins Stone Mansion, is now a historic house museum owned and operated by The Summit County Historical Society of Akron, Ohio. Several items which belonged to the Colonel and his family are on display.

A statue of Colonel Perkins stands near the corner of South Broadway St. and University Ave. in downtown Akron.

Several places in Akron are named for Colonel Perkins and his family. They include, Perkins St., Perkins Park, Perkins Middle School, and Perkins Square.

== Family ==
Colonel Simon and Grace Perkins had eleven children: Anna Bishop, George Tod Perkins, Simon, Alfred, Henry, Maria Allen, Grace Tod, Thomas Kinswan, Charles Ezra, David Tod, and Joseph Douglas.
