= Simon Perkins =

American settler (1771–1844)

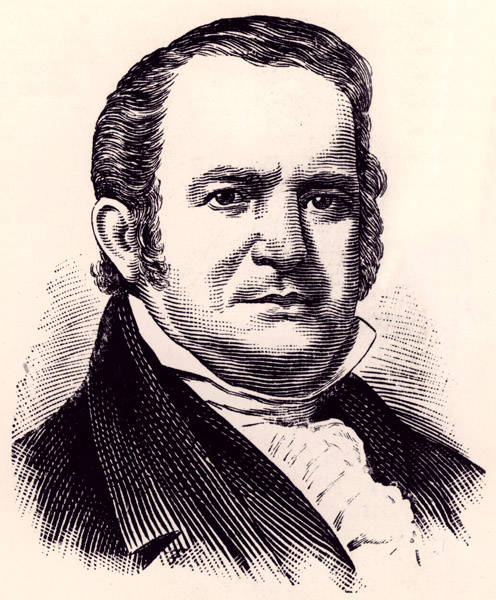
- Engraving of General Simon Perkins from Fifty Years and Over of Akron and Summit County by Samuel A. Lane, from the original oil portrait by Jarvis
- Born: September 17, 1771; Norwich, Connecticut Colony, British America
- Died: November 6, 1844 (aged 73); Warren, Ohio, U.S.
- Known for: Founder of Akron, Ohio

Signature
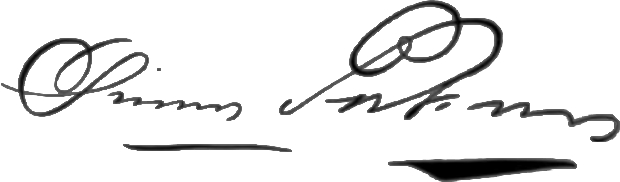

General Simon Perkins (September 17, 1771 – November 6, 1844) was an early settler, businessman and surveyor of the Western Reserve of Connecticut, which would later become northeast Ohio. He co-founded Akron, Ohio, with Paul Williams in 1825. He served as a brigadier-general during the War of 1812.

== Biography ==
Simon Perkins was born on September 17, 1771, in Norwich, Connecticut. He was of mostly English descent though he also had small amounts of Scottish ancestry from his mother. He was the oldest son of Capt. Simon Perkins and Olive Douglas. His father died at age 41 in 1778 while serving in the Continental Army during the American Revolution. Simon was descended from one of the oldest English Puritan families of New England, and his ancestry went back to John Perkins who came to the new world with Roger Williams in 1631. His mother was a descendant of William Douglas, one of the founders of New London, Connecticut. At a young age, Perkins learned how to survey and in 1795 he went to Oswego, New York, where he surveyed and worked in land sales for three years. In late 1797, he was employed by the Erie Land Company to become the company's land agent in Ohio. The Erie Land Company was organized by General Moses Cleaveland and other members of the Connecticut Land Company. He surveyed the company's land holdings in 1798 and established his headquarters in Warren, Ohio, where he lived the rest of his life. He remained an agent of the Erie Land Company until 1831.

In 1801, he was appointed the first postmaster in the Connecticut Western Reserve, remaining in the position until 1829. In 1807, he established a mail route to Detroit by negotiating a treaty with Native American tribes after urging from Postmaster General Gideon Granger.

In 1808, Perkins became a brigadier-general in the Ohio militia. In the War of 1812, he defended the northwestern portion of Ohio from Native American and British attack after General William Hull's surrender of Detroit in the fall of 1812. He commanded approximately 400 men.

Perkins established the Western Reserve Bank of Warren on November 24, 1813. This bank had 64 stockholders and a capital of about $100,000. He also assisted in founding other banks in Painesville and Norwalk. Additionally, Perkins co-founded the Brier Hill Iron & Coal Company, later the Brier Hill Steel Company in Youngstown, Ohio. He served as a trustee of Warren Academy, agent for Aetna Life Insurance Company, and stockholder and president of the Trumbull and Ashtabula Turnpike Company. Most importantly he served as state canal commissioner from 1826 to 1838, being one of the main planners for the route of the Ohio and Erie Canal. He also served as auditor of Trumbull County, Ohio, from 1810 to 1812.

Perkins was one of the largest land owners in the state. Portage County, Ohio, records of 1815 show that he paid one-eleventh of all state real estate taxes from the county. Some of the townships listed are in present-day Summit County, Ohio. Most of these holdings were acquired through outright purchases. Some of his holdings were in what is now Cuyahoga Falls, Ohio, and western Akron, Ohio. On March 25, 1815, he purchased 1,298 acres from Samuel Parkman for $2.08 an acre. This tract would become most of downtown Akron. When he learned of plans for a canal system that would run from Cleveland to the Ohio River, he immediately began to make more purchases of more land in this area. Some of this land was located near Summit Lake, located in what is now south Akron. He hoped that the new canal would be routed through this lake, increasing the value of the land. In 1825, he was successful in convincing the other canal commissioners of this route and therefore donated land to the state for the canal right-of-way. Also in 1825, he and Paul Williams (a settler from Connecticut) donated 100 lots of land to the state, thus founding the City of Akron. It was recorded on December 6, 1825, at the Portage County seat of Ravenna. Due to its location at the highest point on the new canal, Akron quickly became a prosperous town. However, Gen. Perkins never lived in Akron. His oldest son, Colonel Simon Perkins, moved to the Akron area in 1834 to oversee his father's holdings in the area. His large house, the Perkins Stone Mansion, was completed in 1837 and remains to this day, now operated as a house museum by The Summit County Historical Society of Akron, Ohio. Col. Perkins also operated a large sheep farm and wool business, among other concerns, which for a time was managed by the abolitionist John Brown.

Perkins married Nancy Ann Bishop on March 1, 1804. They had nine children, Simon, Anna Maria, Olive Douglas, Alfred, Martha, Charles, Joseph, Jacob and Henry Bishop. Joseph became president of the Bank of Commerce in Cleveland and president and co-founder of Lake View Cemetery. He was also known for leading reform movements in Ohio jails and infirmaries. Jacob became manager and builder for the Cleveland & Mahoning Railroad.

Perkins died November 6, 1844, in Warren, Ohio. His wife died April 24, 1862. Original oil portraits of General and Mrs. Simon Perkins are on view at the Perkins Stone Mansion.
