= List of historical societies in Ohio =

The following is a list of historical societies in the state of Ohio, United States.

== Organizations ==
Cover of the 1905 Proceedings of the Richland County Historical Society, Ohio

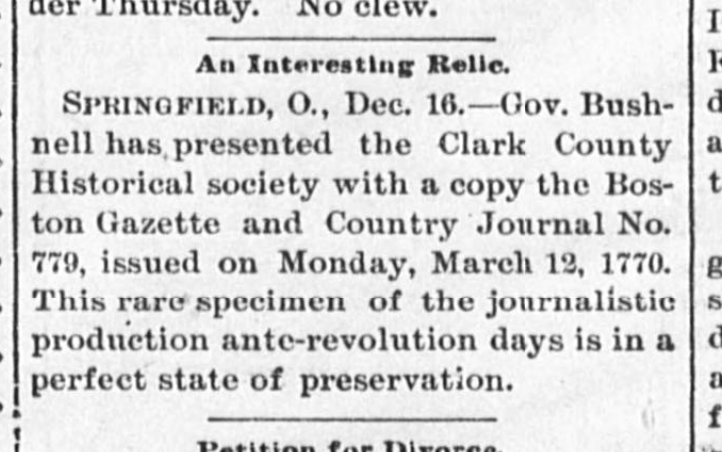
1898 newspaper item about a donation to the Clark County Historical Society in Ohio

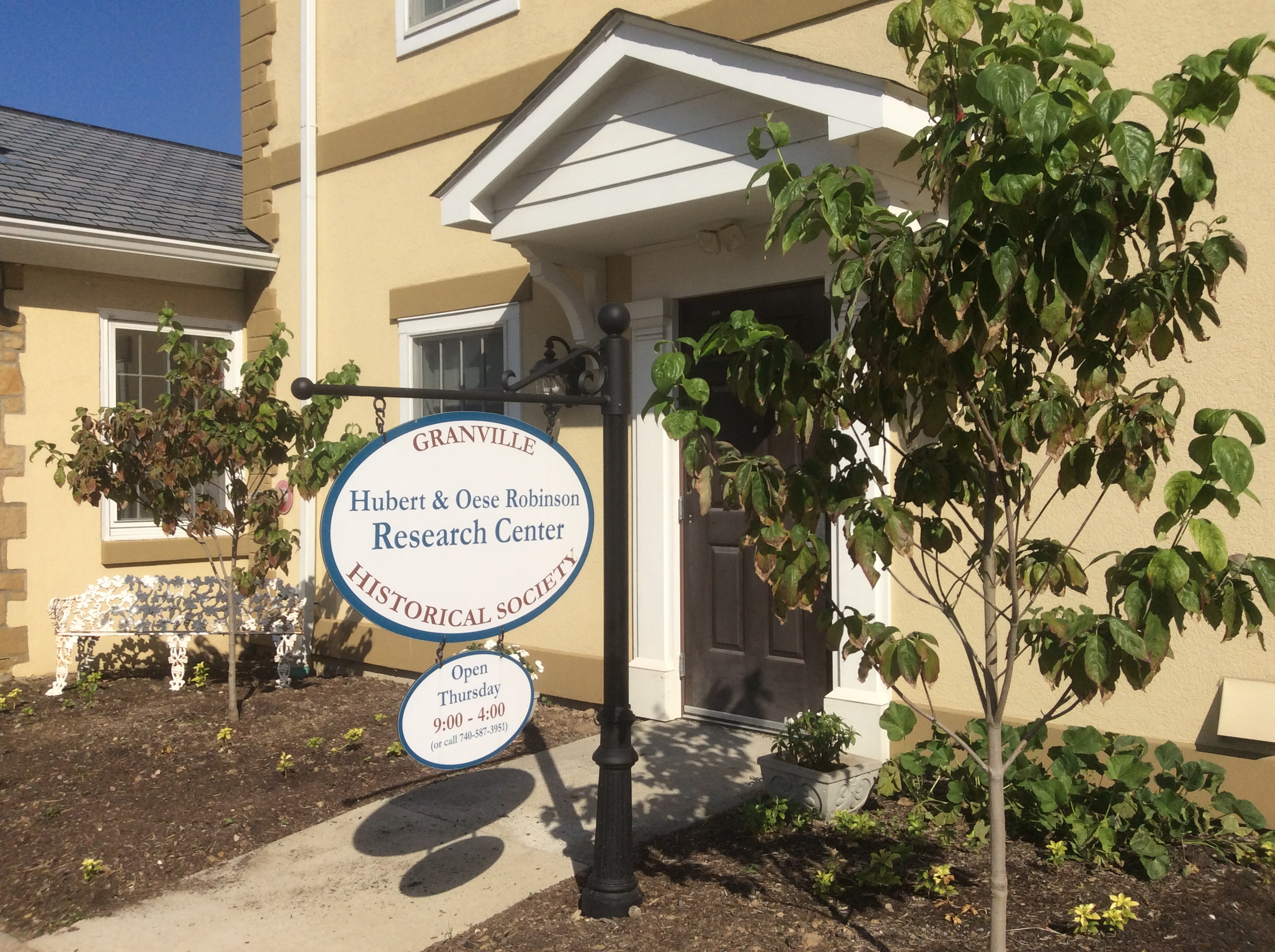
View of Granville Historical Society building in Ohio (photo 2016)

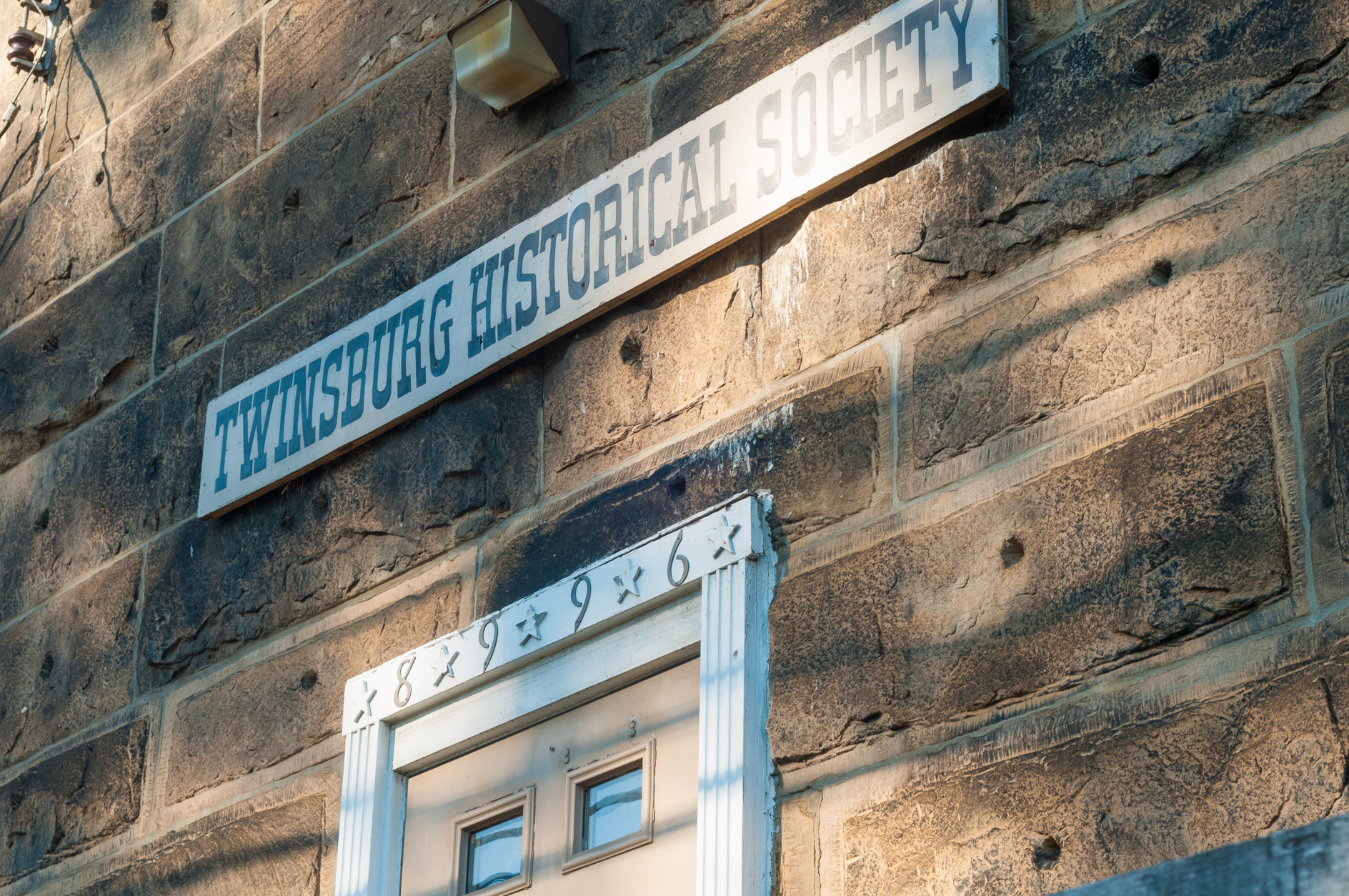
Sign for the Twinsburg Historical Society in Ohio (photo 2014)

- Adams County Historical Society
- Allen County Historical Society
- Alliance Historical Society, Ohio
- Amelia Area Historical Society
- Apple Creek Historical Society
- Ashland County Historical Society & Museum
- Ashtabula County Historical Society
- Bainbridge Historical Society
- Bedford Historical Society
- Belden Historical Society
- Belmont County Historical Society
- Belpre Historical Society
- Berea Historical Society
- Blue Ash Historical Society
- Botkins Historical Society
- Brimfield Historical Society
- Broadview Heights Historical Society
- Brookville Historical Society, Inc.
- Brown County Historical Society
- Brunswick Area Historical Society
- Butler County Historical Society
- Centerville-Washington Township Historical Society
- Chagrin Falls Historical Society
- Chatham Township Historical Society
- Cincinnati Historical Society
- Clark County Historical Society
- Clinton County Genealogical & Historical Society
- Columbus Historical Society
- Conneaut Area Historical Society
- County Line Historical Society of Wayne-Holmes County
- Crestline Historical Society
- Darke County Historical Society
- Defiance County Historical Society
- Delaware County Historical Society
- Dover Historical Society
- Fairport Harbor Historical Society
- Firelands Historical Society
- Fostoria Area Historical Society
- Franklinton Historical Society
- Fredericktown Area Historical Society
- Fulton County Historical Society
- Gallia County Historical & Genealogical Society
- Gates Mills Historical Society
- Granger Historical Society
- Granville Historical Society
- Great Lakes Historical Society
- Historical Society Of Greenfield
- Greenhills Historical Society
- Henry County Historical Society
- Highland County Historical Society
- Hinckley Historical Society
- Historic New Richmond Historical Society
- Historical Society of Old Brooklyn
- Hudson Historical Society
- Huron County Historical Society
- Huron Historical Society
- Jefferson County Historical Association
- Jefferson County Historical Society
- Kelleys Island Historical Association
- Kent Historical Society and Museum
- Knox County Historical Society
- Lake County Historical Society
- Lake Erie Islands Historical Society
- Lake Township Historical Society
- Lakewood Historical Society
- Licking County Historical Society
- Litchfield Historical Society
- Lodi Harrisville Historical Society
- Logan County Historical Society
- Lorain County Historical Society
- Lucasville Area Historical Society
- Madison Historical Society
- Magnolia Area Historical Society
- Mahoning Valley Historical Society
- Manchester Historical Society
- Mantua Historical Society
- Marion County Historical Society
- Mason Historical Society
- Maumee Valley Historical Society
- Medina County Historical Society
- Meigs County Pioneer and Historical Society
- Miami County Historical & Genealogical Society
- Middleburg Heights Historical Society
- Milan Historical Society
- New Washington Ohio Historical Society
- Niles Historical Society
- Noble County Historical Society
- North Baltimore Ohio Area Historical Society
- North Ridgeville Historical Society
- Oakwood Historical Society
- Ohio History Connection (formerly Ohio Historical Society)
- Old Northwest Historical Society
- Olmsted Historical Society
- Pemberville-Freedom Area Historical Society
- Perry County Historical Society
- Perry Historical Society of Lake County
- Plain City Historical Society
- Plymouth Area Historical Society
- Portage County Historical Society
- Preble County Historical Society
- Putnam County Historical Society
- Richfield Historical Society
- Richland County Historical Society
- Riverside Historical Society
- Rocky River Historical Society
- Roseville Historical Society
- Ross County Historical Society
- Salem Historical Society
- Scioto County Historical Society
- Seville Historical Society
- Sharon Township Heritage Society
- Shelby County Historical Society
- Smithville Community Historical Society
- Society of Historic Sharonville
- Spencerville Historical Society
- Stow Historical Society
- Strongsville Historical Society
- Summit County Historical Society of Akron, Ohio
- Tippecanoe Historical Society
- Trotwood-Madison Historical Society
- Troy Historical Society
- Trumbull County Historical Society
- Twinsburg Historical Society
- Union County Historical Society
- Upper Sandusky Historical Society
- Valley City Historical Society
- Van Wert County Historical Society
- Vinton County Historical & Genealogical Society
- Walhonding Valley Historical Society
- Warren County Historical Society
- Washington County Historical Society, Ohio
- Waterville Historical Society
- Wayne County Historical Society of Ohio
- Waynesville Historical Society
- Western Lake Erie Historical Society
- Western Reserve Historical Society
- Westerville Historical Society
- Westwood Historical Society
- Williams County Historical Society
- Windsor Historical Society
- Worthington Historical Society
- York Township Historical Society

== See also ==
- History of Ohio
- List of museums in Ohio
- National Register of Historic Places listings in Ohio
- List of historical societies in the United States
