= Perkins Stone Mansion =

- Perkins, Col. Simon, Mansion
- U.S. National Register of Historic Places
- U.S. Historic district
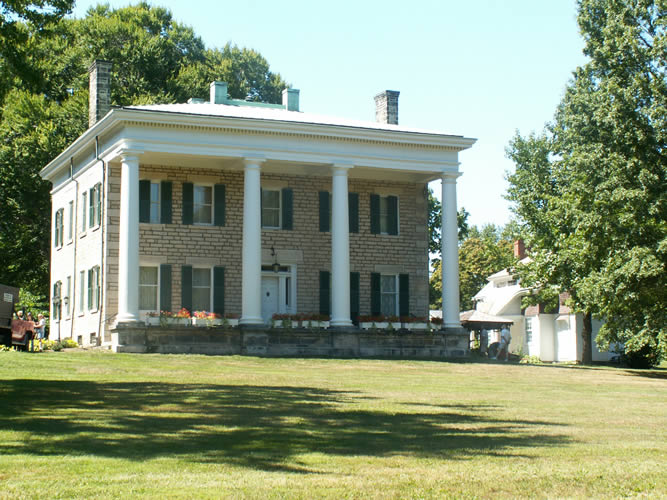
- Location: 550 Copley Rd., Akron, Ohio
- Coordinates: 41°5′6″N 81°32′30″W
- Area: 2.5 acres (1.0 ha)
- Built: 1837
- Architectural style: Greek Revival
- NRHP reference No.: 74001624
- Added to NRHP: August 13, 1974

The Perkins Stone Mansion is a historic house museum in Akron, Ohio, United States.

== Overview ==
The mansion is owned and operated by The Summit County Historical Society of Akron, Ohio and is also the organization's headquarters. It was built from 1835 to 1837 by Col. Simon Perkins, son of Akron's founder General Simon Perkins. It served as the family home until 1945 when it was purchased from George Perkins Raymond for $25,000.

== Design and construction ==
The Perkins Stone Mansion was built between 1835 and 1837 on 115 acres (47 ha) owned by Colonel Simon Perkins, the oldest son of the City of Akron's founder, Gen. Simon Perkins. At the time of its completion, the home was located one mile from the southwest border of Akron and along the prehistoric Portage Path of Summit County, Ohio. The house overlooked the City of Akron from the front porch and the "widow's walk" on the roof provided a viewing point of the Ohio and Erie Canal.

Records suggest it was designed by Isaac Ladd of Warren, Ohio. It was designed in the Greek Revival Style. The Mansion was constructed of hand cut yellow sandstone that was quarried nearby its location.

Perkins eventually expanded his estate to 300 acres (121 ha). The land was used for farming and sheep grazing and eventually became known as "Mutton Hill". The pasture land came right to the front porch and the house was originally flanked by vegetable gardens and an arbor.

== Other structures ==
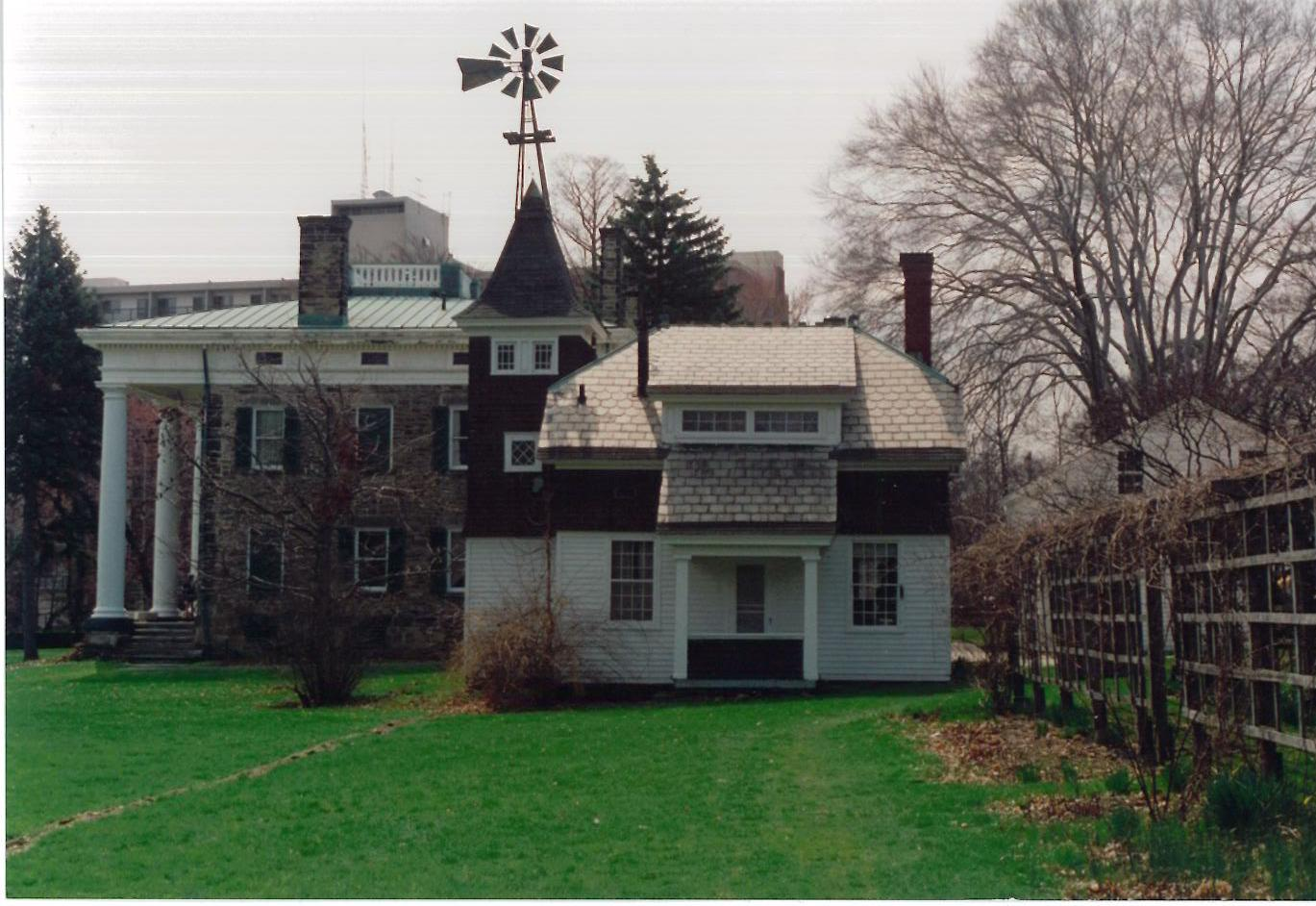
This view of the Perkins Stone Mansion shows the Wash House, one of the outbuildings on the property.

Located nearby the Mansion is the Wash House where the Perkins family washed and dried clothing, bedding, and other textiles. Next to the Wash House is the original well. Behind the mansion is the "woodshed" that now serves as the office building for the Summit County Historical Society of Akron, Ohio. Reconstructed versions of the Carriage House, gazebo, and outhouse are also located on the property. The property was surrounded by a dry mortared stone wall, much of which remains to this day.

== Ownership and residents ==
- 1837–1887: Col. Simon Perkins and his wife Grace.
- 1887–1919: Anna Perkins, the eldest daughter of Col. and Mrs. Simon Perkins. Anna never married and took over as the mistress of the house at the death of her mother in 1867. Her brother George Tod Perkins assisted with maintenance and renovations.
- 1919–1926: Mr C.B. and Mrs Mary Raymond. Mary was the daughter of George Tod Perkins and niece of Anna Perkins.
- 1926–1945: George Perkins Raymond. George took over occupancy when his parents moved to California in 1926. Due to his career as a concert singer, he rarely stayed in the home.
- 1945–present: The Summit County Historical Society of Akron, Ohio. It was purchased from Raymond for $25,000. The funds were raised through contributions.

== Present day ==
Today, the Perkins Stone Mansion is the showpiece of the Summit County Historical Society and is operated as an historic house museum.
