= First Baptist Church of Greater Cleveland =

Coordinates: 41°29′8.9″N 81°32′56.2″W

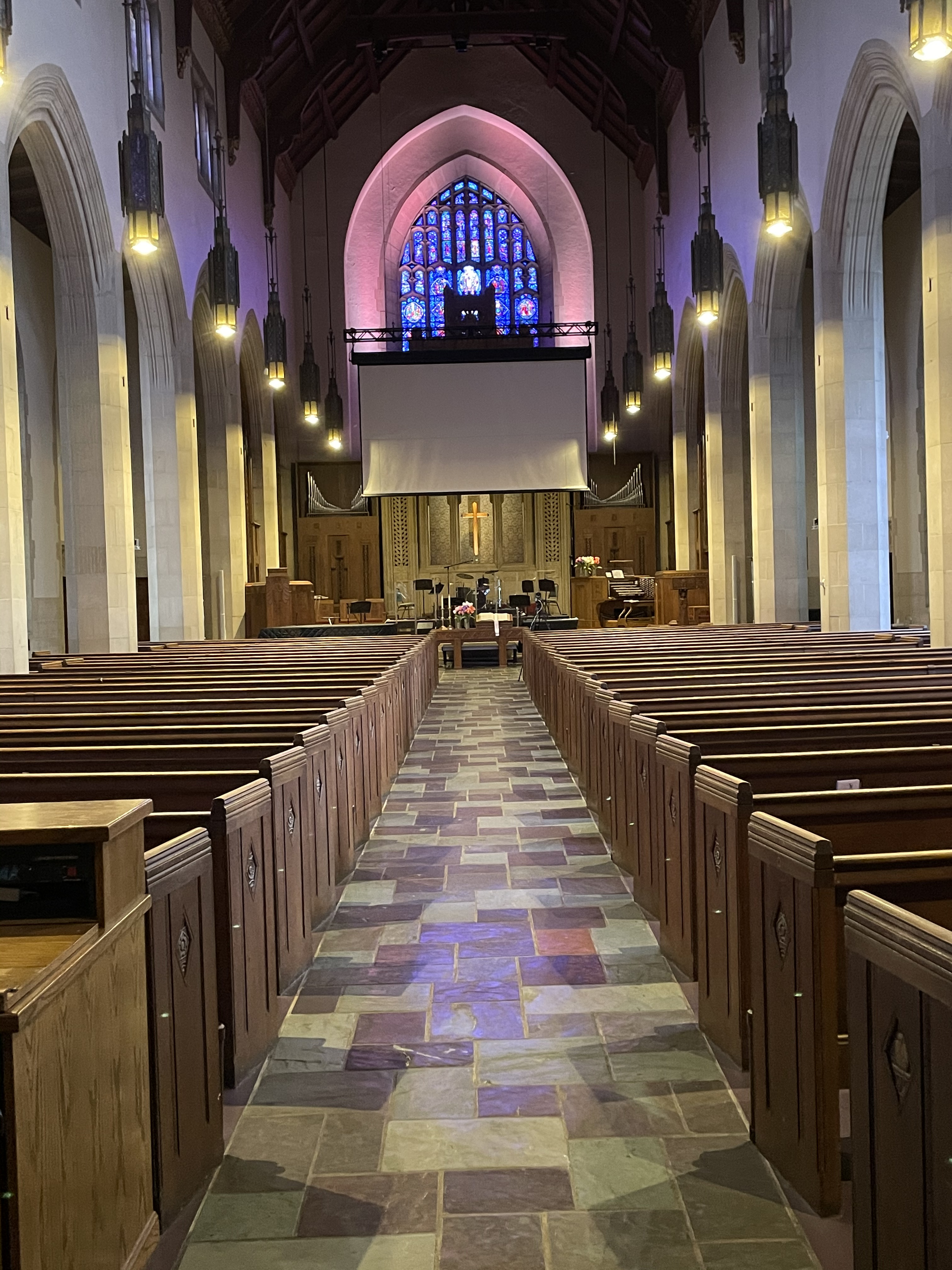
Sanctuary of First Baptist Church of Greater Cleveland

The First Baptist Church of Greater Cleveland is an historic Baptist church in Shaker Heights, Ohio. Founded in 1833, it was the first Baptist church in the Cleveland, Ohio area and is the fourth oldest church in Cleveland.

Founded in 1833, the church is a congregation of the American Baptist Churches, USA and the Cleveland Baptist Association of Churches. It is in partnership with the Greater Cleveland Congregations.

== Founding ==
The founders of the church were Moses White, Benjamin, and Rebecca Rouse, and Mary Belden. They originally met in private homes. As the congregation grew, they moved to the brick court-house on Public Square in Cleveland.

On November 19, 1832, a Baptist minister, Rev. Richmond Taggart from Lockport, New York preached for the group in a stop in Cleveland. The services were held in a meeting room on the upper floor of the Cleveland Academy. Following the services, a group formed "The First Baptist Society of Cleveland, Ohio."

On February 16, 1833, 17 individuals established the First Baptist Church of Cleveland. Charter members included African Americans John Malvin and his wife, Harriet (married 8 March 1829). The membership grew rapidly during their first year. A small church building (near Public Square) was built by the congregation for $18,000. The first permanent pastor was Rev. Levi Tucker who was installed in April 1836 and served until 1842. In 1855, the Plymouth Church building was purchased to provide additional space for the growing congregation.

== Abolitionist congregation ==
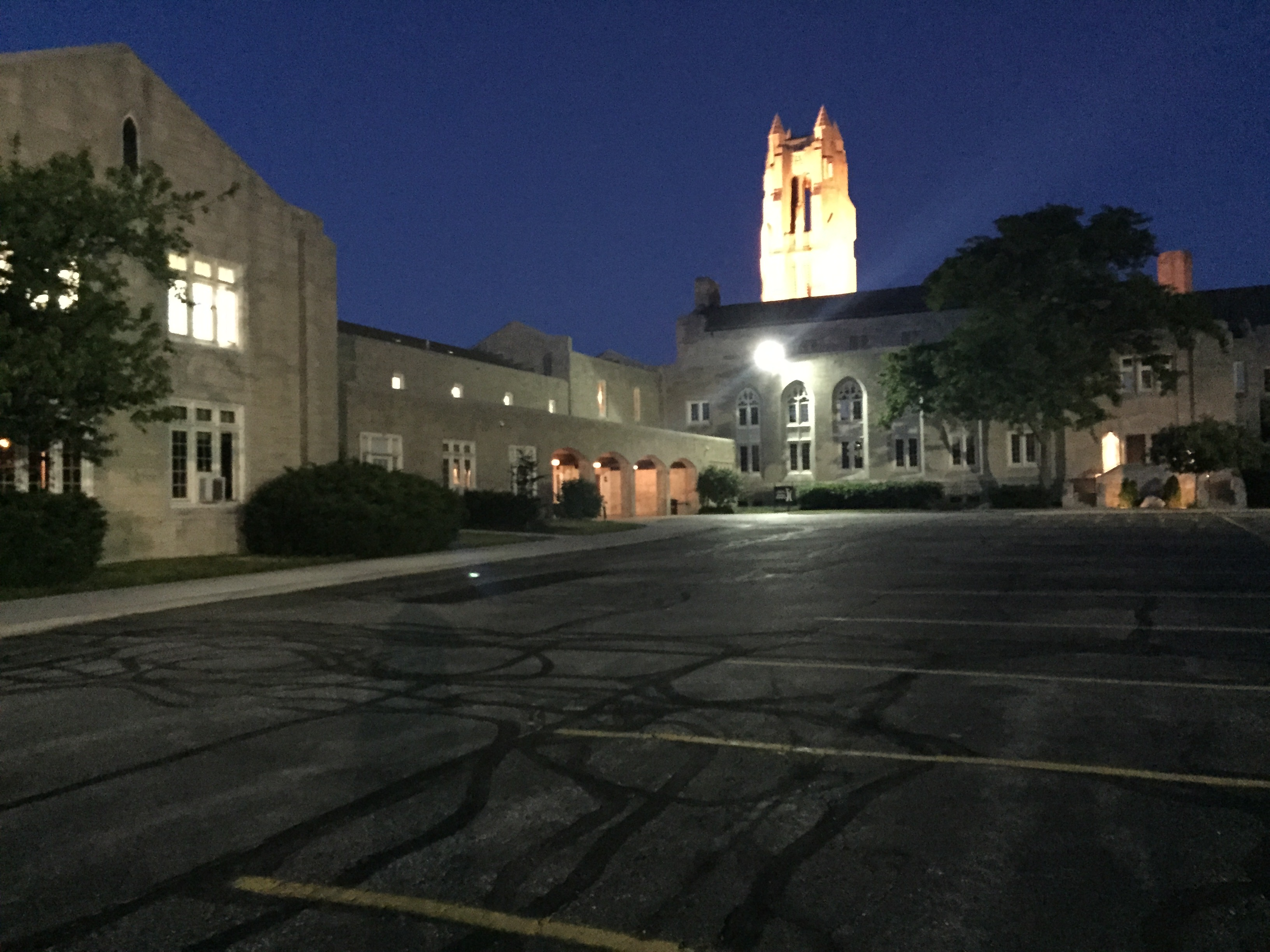

Charter member John Malvin came to the church with a license to preach the Gospel from the Enon Baptist Church in Cincinnati. Malvin refused to allow segregation of the races during services, a common practice at that time. His stance persuaded the congregation to permit anyone to sit anywhere they choose, He frequently preached at First Baptist. Several key members of the congregation assisted Malvin in helping runaway slaves, setting up classroom education, and in efforts to overturn Ohio's Black Codes. The church was a supporter of the Ohio Anti-Slavery Society.

In 1849 First Baptist supported a mission to establish the first African American Baptist Church of Cleveland, Shiloh Baptist Church.

"Father John", Malvin remained a lifetime member of First Baptist Church of Cleveland. He died on July 1, 1880, at his Cleveland home and was buried in the Erie Street cemetery.

== Education and growth ==
Following Rev. Levi Tucker, the church called Reverend Seymour W. Adams, D.D. in November 1846 to serve the church until his death on September 24, 1864.

In 1852, a cottage Sunday School was established near Dodge street given by Judge Bishop and James Root of Hartford, Conn. Deacon B. Rouse was the first superintendent. Over the next fourteen years, the group grew by over a hundred members. A member of the church, Stillman Witt, gave generously to the congregation. A tablet was erected in the church sanctuary in his memory upon following his death on April 29, 1875.

In October 1865, Rev. Dr. Augustus Hopkins Strong became pastor of First Baptist Church. Strong was a graduate of Yale He served until 1872 when he went from there to become president of Rochester Theological Seminary. His book Systematic Theology (1886) was a recognized major theological work of the period for those of the Baptist Faith.

In 1874, the Idaka Sunday School was organized and grew from 128 to 255 students under Dr. A. J. Behrends (June 1873-February 1876) and Dr. George W. Gardner (October 1876 - June 1878). Dr. Gardner came from Marblehead, MA but left shortly after his arrival to become president of Pella University, Pella, Iowa, Rev. Philip S. Moxom became pastor on April 1, 1879, and served until August 1885.

By the late 1880s, the First Baptist had outgrown its building and explored a union with members of the Idaka Chapel which had been a mission of the church but formed their own independent congregation in 1880. The churches consolidated on April 28, 1887, with a new church building uniting them together at the corner of Prospect and Kennard Street. This was the third building of the First Baptist Church. The church had a tower 120 feet high with Amherst sandstone exterior. The church was built debt-free when the cornerstone was laid on September 29, 1889.

In 1900, seventeen members of the church formed the East Cleveland Baptist Church. Ministers of the period included Dr. A.G. Upham (September 1892-March 1897), Dr. William Lowndes Pickard (October 1897-January 1902), and Dr. Herbert F. Stilwell (March 1903-May 1916). Dr. Stilwell was the national leader in the Northern Baptist Convention. He left the congregation to become the General Superintendent of Evangelism for the American Baptist Home Mission Society.

Dr. David Bovington became pastor in January 1917, coming from Rochester Theological Seminary where he taught homiletics for ten years. Born in England when America joined the Great War,”he cheered and comforted many a sad heart too brave to complain." He was a strong advocate for world missions.

Many prominent families in the Cleveland community were leaders within First Baptist: Deacon Gustavus A. Hyde (Head of Engineering of Cleveland Gas Company), Deacon Samuel W. Burrows (Second Lieutenant 27th New York Cavalry and prisoner of war during the American Civil War), Deacon Louis A. Osborn, Deacon Oscar Townsend President of the Cleveland, Columbus and Cincinnati Railway, Henry A. Sherwin (one of the founders of the Sherwin-Williams Company), Deacon Chandler Snow, Deacon John Ralph Owens, Deacon A.L. Talcott (President of the Cleveland Baptist Home Mission Society and leader of the Prohibition Party), and Deacon Jacob Faber.

During this period, several groups out of the congregation formed new Baptist works in the growing communities of Cleveland. These include The Euclid Avenue Baptist (the church home of John Davison Rockefeller), Willson Avenue Baptist Church, Superior Avenue Baptist Church, Trinity Baptist Church, Church of the Master, and East Cleveland Baptist Church.

== Formation of First Baptist Church of Greater Cleveland ==
During the 1920s the congregational leadership began conversations with the Cleveland Heights Baptist Church to unite in order to build a modern church. Cleveland Heights Baptist had been meeting in a school beginning in 1926. Their merger formed the First Baptist Church of Greater Cleveland, together they chose to relocate in the middle of the growing communities of Cleveland Heights, Shaker Heights and University Heights.

The architectural firm of Walker and Weeks was chosen to create plans for the new building to be located in Shaker Heights. The building largely features Indiana limestone constructed in a Neo-Gothic design with a large interior courtyard. A 130-foot bell tower became the most prominent feature of the church thanks to donations from Ambrose Swasey. The tower was named the Swasey Tower in his honor. Among its many features include angelic faces facing four directions overlooking the community (similar to the Art-Deco statues designed by sculptor Henry Hering and architect Frank Walker – titled the "Guardians of Traffic on the Hope Memorial Bridge.)The stone sculptor of FBCGC's Guardians was Walter Sinz (1881 – 1966). His best-known work was the Thompson Trophy- the prize for the premiere aircraft racing 1921–1961. He was educated at the Cleveland School of Art, where he also taught from 1911 to 1952. When the final design of the church was presented, the Van Sweringen Company who oversaw the development of the area canceled the final payment of $25,000.

The construction took over a year. The church building was formally dedicated in June 1929. The building was designated a Shaker Heights Landmark on January 24, 1977.

The church sanctuary stained glass windows were donated by various families of the congregation from 1928 to 1949. Each glass panel was custom-designed in the French Neo-Gothic style by the Boston glass studios of Reynolds, Francis, and Rohnstock.

The First Baptist Church of Greater Cleveland organ was built by The Austin Organ Company in 1911 for the building on Euclid. It was dismantled, enlarged, moved, and incorporated into the front and rear chambers of the Fairmont building sanctuary. It was rebuilt by the Austin Company in 1954, and additional work was done by the Schlicker Organ Company in 1970. In the 1990s, during the ministry of Dr. Robert Schneider, Director of Music and Organist (1993-2018), with the assistance of Timothy Edward Smith, a consultant, the organ was upgraded by the Southfield Organ Builders of Springfield, Massachusetts.

Dr. Harold Cooke Phillips served as the new building's first Senior Pastor in 1928. He oversaw the church until 1958. A bronze bust of Dr. H.C. Phillips is found just off the main sanctuary, near the pulpit where he preached. Rev. Russell H. Bishop served the church as Senior Pastor following Dr. Phillips (1958–1976), who was followed by Rev. Gilbert F. Helwig (1977–1998), Rev. Chris Bennett (2003–2005), Rev. Martin Rolfs Massaglia (2006–2014), and Rev. Dr. Kregg Burris (2015– October 2023). Rev. Dr. Kevin VanHook II is the current Senior Pastor, called in July 2024.

== Education ==
In 1957, an educational wing of the church was added to the church and named after the director of Christian Education, Dr. Francis C. Wheaton. Soon after that, a weekday childcare ministry was established. In 1974, the Children's Center of First Baptist Church was licensed as a daycare and preschool and serves the community to the present. In 2017, the Cleveland Life Institute, under the direction of Rev. Dr. Kregg Burris and Dr. Victor Bull, established a one-year program to advocate and instruct individuals in social enterprise and entrepreneurship. Its first class began in January 2018. In 2022, the Cleveland Life Institute became the Institute for Social Enterprises to better identify with the purpose and nature of the program. Dr. Victor Bull was the President of the Institute for Social Enterprises until the church withdrew support in 2023.

== Music and Fine Arts ==
The Neo-Gothic design of the Sanctuary has been utilized by many local performing arts organizations such as Apollo's Fire, a baroque orchestral ensemble under the direction of Jeanette Sorrel, the Cleveland Chamber Choir, the Suburban Symphony, the Heights Chamber Orchestra, and the Cleveland Opera.

In addition to the acoustically enhanced Sanctuary, the Spahr Center, named after the late Charles Spahr, former CEO of Sohio, has been the home of the Happy Ending Lyric Players (HELP) a community theater ensemble founded by church members in 1976. The Arts programs have been under the stewardship of G. Michael Skerritt since 1990. Annual selections of Broadway musicals, opera, operetta, drama, comedy, and dance are performed as part of the worship and fine art calendar. Many of these events have been accompanied by visual art exhibits by local artists.
