= Summit County Historical Society of Akron, Ohio =

Nonprofit organization

The Summit County Historical Society of Akron, Ohio, abbreviated SCHS, is a 501(c)(3) non-profit organization located in Akron, Ohio. It focuses on the history of the City of Akron and Summit County, Ohio.

== Purpose ==
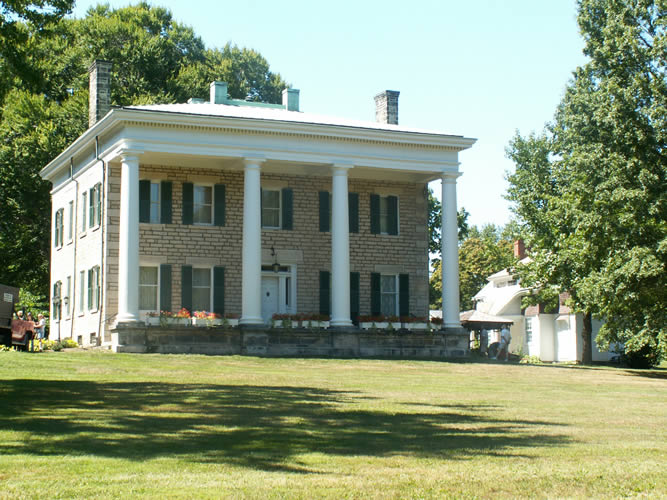
The Perkins Stone Mansion is one of the properties owned by the Summit County Historical Society.

The mission of SCHS is to preserve and interpret the history of Summit County and Akron, and to educate communities about the people and events that have shaped the local history. The Society owns and manages three properties: the Perkins Stone Mansion, John Brown House, and Old Stone School in downtown Akron—a joint project with Akron Public Schools. Two properties are open to visitors, the John Brown House and the Perkins Stone Mansion. They are open for tours, educational programs, special events, and other appropriate uses. The Summit County Historical Society is a member of the Ohio Local History Alliance, the Northeast Ohio Inter-Museum Council and the American Association for State and Local History.

Sheep were a vital part of the Perkins farm in the past. So, currently, each summer a flock of sheep are loaned from a local farm and brought to the property. Shepherding demonstrations are offered during this season.

== History ==
The Summit County Historical Society (SCHS) was founded in 1924 by the Cuyahoga Portage chapter of the Daughters of the American Revolution to celebrate the centennial of the City of Akron. In 1929, the Society acquired its first property, the Old Stone School on South Broadway. The 1840 stone school building was donated by the City of Akron. In 1939, Carl Pockrandt was elected president of the Society, a post he held for over thirty years. Under his leadership membership swelled to almost 2,000. At the death of May Perkins, widow of Charles Perkins, in 1943 the John Brown House was bequeathed to the Society, with $10,000 (~$148,594 in 2025) for its upkeep. The one-time home of the famed abolitionist was to be used for historical purposes. In 1945, the Society purchased the Perkins Stone Mansion from George Perkins Raymond for $25,000 (~$353,952 in 2025).

A time capsule was buried in the porch of the Perkins Stone Mansion in 1950. It was opened in 2000 and contained several historic documents and artifacts relating to local history. In 1965, SCHS acquired Bronson Memorial Church in Peninsula. The 1839 church was maintained by the Cuyahoga Valley Association until 1982. It was deeded to the Peninsula Valley Historic & Education Foundation in 2003.

In 1967, during a joint effort with Akron Public Schools, the Society restored the Old Stone School. Today, Akron Public Schools and The Society host school visits and special events at the site.

In 1976, SCHS hired its first Executive Director, James D. Strider. In 1981, the Society sponsored the publication of Akron: City at the Summit by George Knepper and in 1983, SCHS renovated the former wood shed into exhibit space and offices. A bequest by Carl Pockrandt of $11,000 was used for the renovation. The building was named in his honor. The space continues to house the staff offices and Mutton Hill Gift Shop.

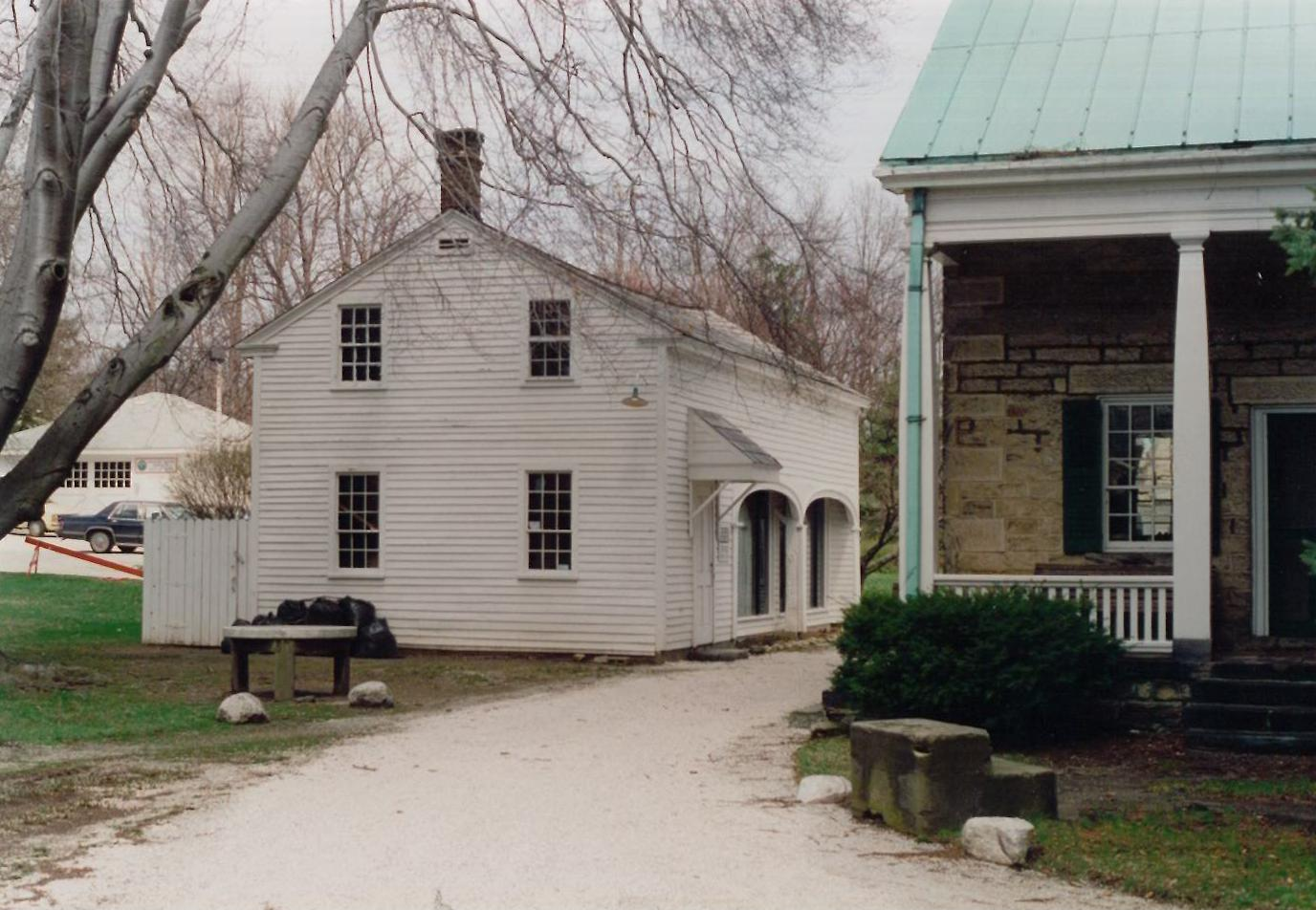
This building, the former woodshed, houses staff offices and is located behind the Perkins Stone Mansion.

In 1986, the Perkins Stone Mansion was completely restored and in 1992 the Carriage house was renovated for the use of exhibits and meeting space.

The Wash House was renovated in 1994. In 1998, the John Brown House and Perkins Stone Mansion and a portion of the stone wall were renovated followed by a renovation of the Pockrandt Visitor Center in 2001. In 2006, the interior restoration was part of a project guided by the Junior League of Akron and a replica of the original Perkins Gazebo was erected on the grounds.

== Present day ==
The Summit County Historical Society continues to provide historical information and research to the Akron area. It loans "Discovery Trunks" to individuals and groups free of charge. These trunks focus on World War I, the Victorian woman, American consumerism of the early 20th century, the Lighter Than Air industry, The Perkins Stone Mansion, African-American history, the 1960s, the Cascade Locks in Akron, the Ohio and Erie Canal, and John Brown (abolitionist). Educational programs are provided to local schools on The Ohio and Erie Canal and Prehistoric life in Summit County. "Remember When..." programs are available to clubs, senior groups, libraries, churches, and independent/assisted living facilities. These programs cover World War I, World War II, the Victorian Woman, Inventions, The Hobo, Grandma's Attic / Grandpa's Garage, The Baby Boom Years, Victorian Valentines, Doctor's Black Bag, Christmas Traditions, Reliving Christmas Through Music, and the Ohio and Erie Canal. "Remember When..." programs are provided for a fee and are made possible by grants. Two programs are provided to fourth grade classes in the Akron Public School system, "Towpath to the Past" and "River Through Time."

The Society maintains a collection of thousands of donated artifacts including clothing, tools, furniture, personal belongings, and artwork relating to Akron and Summit County. Its extensive archival collection is housed at the Special Collections Division at the Main Branch of the Akron-Summit County Public Library.

The Society currently employs six staff members with assistance to the staff provided by volunteers. Monetary support is provided by membership, donations, and grants.

== Executive directors ==
- James C. Cooper 1966–1967
- William V. Wallace 1967–1976
- James D. Strider 1976–1981
- Jeffery Smith 1981–1991
- Stephen H. Paschen 1991–1997
- Paula G. Moran 1997–2009
- Leianne Neff Heppner 2009–present

== See also ==
- List of historical societies in Ohio
