= List of museums in Ohio =

This list of museums in Ohio is a list of museums, defined for this context as institutions (including nonprofit organizations, government entities, and private businesses) that collect and care for objects of cultural, artistic, scientific, or historical interest and make their collections or related exhibits available for public viewing. Museums that exist only in cyberspace or on the Internet (i.e., virtual museums) are not included. Also included are non-profit and university art galleries.

- See also List of museums in Cincinnati.
- See also List of museums in Cleveland.
- See also List of museums in Columbus, Ohio.

== Museums ==
Name	Town/city	County	Region	Type	Summary
103rd Ohio Volunteer Infantry Museum	Sheffield Lake	Lorain	Northeast	Civil War	Open by appointment
1810 House	Portsmouth	Scioto	Southwest	Historic house	Operated by the Scioto County Historical Society
A.B. Graham Memorial Center	Conover	Miami	Southwest	Biographical	Honors 4-H founder A.B. Graham
Adena Mansion	Chillicothe	Ross	Southwest	Historic house	Early 19th-century mansion on 300 acres (1.2 km^{2})
AHA! A Hands-On Adventure	Lancaster	Fairfield	Central	Children's	
Akron Art Museum	Akron	Summit	Northeast	Art	Collection focus is art produced since 1850
Alexandria Museum	Alexandria	Licking	Central	Local history	
Algonquin Mill Complex	Carrollton	Carroll	Northeast	Open air	Operated by the Carroll County Historical Society, includes mill, farm museum, schoolhouse, several log cabins, farmhouse and barns
Allen County Museum	Lima	Allen	Northwest	Multiple	Includes main local history museum, log house, Victorian mansion, locomotive display, military/transportation building and children's museum
Allen Memorial Art Museum	Oberlin	Lorain	Northeast	Art	Part of Oberlin College
Alpine Hills Museum	Sugarcreek	Tuscarawas	Northeast	Local history	Early days of Swiss and Amish heritage
Alverta Green Museum	Mason	Warren	Southwest	Historic house	Operated by the Mason Historical Society, Victorian house with period room displays
American Civil War Museum of Ohio	Tiffin	Seneca	Northeast	Civil War	
American Sign Museum	Cincinnati	Hamilton	Southwest	Commercial signage	
America's Packard Museum	Dayton	Montgomery	Southwest	Automotive	Classic Packards and historic Packard memorabilia
Amish & Mennonite Heritage Center	Berlin	Holmes	Northeast	Religious	Features the Behalt Cyclorama, a mural-in-the-round depicting Amish/Mennonite history
Anti-Saloon League Museum	Westerville	Franklin	Central	History	History of the Anti-Saloon League
Arms Family Museum	Youngstown	Mahoning	Northeast	Historic house	Operated by the Mahoning Valley Historical Society, Arts and Crafts "Greystone" house with original period rooms
Armstrong Air and Space Museum	Wapakoneta	Auglaize	Northwest	Aerospace	Ohio's contributions to the history of space flight, life of astronaut Neil Armstrong
ArtSpace Lima	Lima	Allen	Northwest	Art	Changing exhibits
Asahel Wright House Museum	Centerville	Montgomery	Southwest	Local history	Operated by the Centerville-Washington Township Historical Society, replica one-room schoolhouse
Ashland County Historical Society Museum	Ashland	Ashland	Northeast	Multiple	Includes 3 houses with exhibits of decorative arts, natural history and insect collection, household items, local industries, carriages
Ashtabula Maritime Museum	Ashtabula	Ashtabula	Northeast	Maritime	Housed in the former residence of the lighthouse keepers and the Coast Guard Chief
Ashton House Museum	Carrollton	Carroll	Northeast	Local history	
Auman Museum of Radio & Television	Dover	Tuscarawas	Northeast	Technology	Historic television sets, radios and related memorabilia, open by appointment
Aurora Historical Society Museum	Aurora	Portage	Northeast	Local history	
Austintown Log House	Austintown	Mahoning	Northeast	Historic house	Operated by the Austintown Historical Society
Baker Family Museum	Caldwell	Noble	Southeast	Decorative arts	Includes local glass and porcelain, antiques, lamps, grandfather clocks, music boxes and other historical items
Baltic Area Historical Society Museum	Baltic	Tuscarawas	Northeast	Local history	
Baltimore Community Museum	Baltimore	Fairfield	Central	Local history	
Bear's Mill	Greenville	Darke	Southwest	Mill	Mid-19th-century water-powered grist mill
Beaver Creek State Park Pioneer Village	East Liverpool	Columbiana	Northeast	Open air	Ten structures that represent Ohio history from its early pioneer days to the Victorian period including Gaston's Mill
Bedford Historical Society	Bedford	Cuyahoga	Northeast	Local history	Exhibits about Ohio history, Bedford Township, Civil War and Western Reserve, 1832 Hezekiah Dunham House reflecting three periods of ownership
Belmont County Victorian Mansion Museum	Barnesville	Belmont	Southeast	Historic house	Late 19th-century period Victorian mansion
Benninghofen House	Hamilton	Butler	Southwest	Historic house	Operated by the Butler County Historical Society, mid-19th-century house reflecting owners through the 20th century
Beta Theta Pi Fraternity Museum	Oxford	Butler	Southwest	History	History of Beta Theta Pi fraternity
Bible Walk	Mansfield	Richland	Northeast	Religious	Wax museum of Biblical figures
Bicycle Museum of America	New Bremen	Auglaize	Northwest	Transportation	Bicycles and memorabilia
Blakeslee Log Cabin	Ashtabula	Ashtabula	Northeast	Historic house	Operated by the Ashtabula Historical Society, 1810 log cabin
Bob Evans Homestead Museum	Bidwell	Gallia	Southeast	Multiple	Historical farm, company museum, open-air village
Boonshoft Museum of Discovery	Dayton	Montgomery	Southwest	Science	Children's museum of science, includes Apollo Observatory
Bowling Green State University Fine Art Galleries	Bowling Green	Wood	Northwest	Art	Includes Dorothy Uber Bryan, Willard Wankelman and Hiroko Nakamoto Galleries
Bradford Ohio Railroad Museum	Bradford	Darke	Southwest	Railroad	
British Transportation Museum	Dayton	Montgomery	Southwest	Automobile	Open by appointment, historic British-made cars
Brookville Railroad Depot	Brookville	Montgomery	Southwest	Railroad	Operated by the Brookville Historical Society
Brooklyn Historical Society Museum	Brooklyn	Cuyahoga	Northeast	Local history	
Brownella Cottage	Galion	Crawford	Northwest	Historic house	Operated by the Galion Historical Society, 1887 house with original furnishings
Buckeye Furnace	Milton Township	Jackson	Southeast	Industry	Operated by the Ohio History Connection, reconstructed charcoal-fired iron blast furnace
Buckeye Telephone Museum	Marion	Marion	Southwest	Telephone	Open by appointment, history of the telephone industry with memorabilia dating back to the 1800s
Burchfield Homestead	Salem	Columbiana	Northeast	Historic house	Boyhood home of artist Charles E. Burchfield, features his art
Butler Institute of American Art	Youngstown	Mahoning	Northeast	Art	American art
Butts Museum	Fowler	Trumbull	Northeast	Local history	
Byesville Scenic Railway	Byesville	Guernsey	Southeast	Railroad/Mining	Heritage railroad and mining museum display
Caesar's Creek Pioneer Village	Waynesville	Warren	Southwest	Open air	Located in Caesar Creek State Park, over 15 log cabins and other buildings
Campus Martius Museum	Marietta	Washington	Southeast	History	Settlement of Ohio, operated by the Ohio History Connection
Canton Classic Car Museum	Canton	Stark	Northeast	Automotive	Historic cars and memorabilia
Canton Museum of Art	Canton	Stark	Northeast	Art	
Carillon Historical Park	Dayton	Montgomery	Southwest	Multiple	Historic buildings and exhibits concerning the history of technology and the history of Dayton, includes Newcom Tavern
Carl's Gas Station & 50's Memories	Bucyrus	Crawford	Northwest	Agriculture	Working garage with 1950s collectibles including Elvis memorabilia and jukeboxes, tours by appointment
Carriage Hill MetroPark Historical Farm	Dayton	Montgomery	Southwest	Farm	Operated by Five Rivers MetroParks, 19th-century period working farm
Carroll County Arts Center	Carrollton	Carroll	Northeast	Art	
The Castle	Marietta	Washington	Southeast	Historic house	Victorian period Gothic Revival style house
Castle Noel	Medina	Medina	Northeast	Christmas museum	
Central Insurance Companies Fire Museum	Van Wert	Van Wert	Northwest	Firefighting	Open 1–3 p.m. on the third Friday of each month or by appointment
Century Village Museum	Burton	Geauga	Northeast	Open air	Also known as the Geauga County Historical Society & Museum, historic buildings spanning over 100 years
Champaign Aviation Museum	Urbana	Champaign	Southwest	Aerospace	Located at Grimes Field
Champaign County Historical Museum	Urbana	Champaign	Southwest	Local history	
Charles Young Buffalo Soldiers National Monument	Wilberforce	Greene	Southwest	Biographical	Life of Charles Young, the third African American graduate of West Point, the first black U.S. national park superintendent, the first African American military attaché, and the highest ranking black officer in the United States Army until his death in 1922.
Chester Courthouse	Long Bottom	Meigs	Southeast	Local history	Operated by the Chester-Shade Historical Association, displays of local history
Chilo Lock 34 Park	Chilo	Clermont	Southwest	Transportation	Museum and visitor center with exhibits about the history of the Ohio River, canals, locks and dams, located in the former operations building of the old Lock and Dam #34
Chrisholm Historic Farmstead	Trenton	Butler	Southwest	Historic house	Late 19th-century farmhouse open for special events, also known as Samuel Augspurger Farm
Clague House Museum	Westlake	Cuyahoga	Northeast	Historic house	Operated by the Westlake Historical Society
Clark County Heritage Center	Springfield	Clark	Southwest	Local history	Operated by the Clark County Historical Society
Clark Gable Birthplace and Museum	Cadiz	Harrison	Northeast	Biographical	Reconstructed birthplace home and childhood life of actor Clark Gable
Cleo Redd Fisher Museum	Loudonville	Ashland	Northeast	Local history	Operated by the Mohican Historical Society
Clifton Mill	Clifton	Greene	Southwest	Mill	19th-century water-powered grist mill and restaurant, includes adjacent 1940s Gas Station Museum and seasonal Santa Claus Museum
Collectors Decanters & Steins Museum	Sugarcreek	Tuscarawas	Northeast	Commodity	Store and museum of decanters
Conneaut Historical Railroad Museum	Conneaut	Ashtabula	Northeast	Railroad	Located in a historic depot
Cooke-Dorn House	Sandusky	Erie	Northeast	Historic house	1950s period house
Cowan Pottery Museum	Rocky River	Cuyahoga	Northeast	Art - Pottery	Collection of Cowan Pottery, located in the Rocky River Public Library
Crawford Museum of Agriculture	Bucyrus	Crawford	Northwest	Agriculture	Also known as Crawford Antique Farm Museum, includes farm machinery, tractors and household items from yesteryear, open by appointment
Crestline Historical Museum	Crestline	Crawford	Northwest	Local History	Open 1st and 3rd full weekends Saturday and Sunday 2:00 p.m. – 4:00 p.m. and by appointment
Creek Bend Farm	Lindsey	Sandusky	Northeast	Farm	1930s–1950s era farm park
Custer Monument & Museum	New Rumley	Harrison	Northeast	Biographical	Open by appointment and for events, life of General George Custer
Cuyahoga Valley Historical Museum	Peninsula	Summit	Northeast	Local history	Branch of the Peninsula Library
Dairy Barn Arts Center	Athens	Athens	Southeast	Art	Regional and national contemporary art exhibits
Daniel Gebhart Tavern Museum	Miamisburg	Montgomery	Southwest	Historic building	Restored 1811 log tavern administered by the Miamisburg Historical Society
Daniel McCook House	Carrollton	Carroll	Northeast	Historic house	Operated by the Carroll County Historical Society and the Ohio History Connection
Daniel Mooney Museum	St. Marys	Auglaize	Northwest	Historic house	Operated by the Auglaize County Historical Society
David Nickens Heritage Center	Chillicothe	Ross	Southwest	African American	Operated by the First Baptist Church Chillicothe, exhibits about local and national African American culture, open by appointment
David Warther Carvings Museum	Sugarcreek	Tuscarawas	Northeast	Commodity	Store and ship carvings museum
Dayton Art Institute	Dayton	Montgomery	Southwest	Art	Museum and school
Dayton Aviation Heritage National Historical Park	Dayton	Montgomery	Southwest	Multiple	Four sites about the Wright Brothers, local aviation heritage and local history
Dayton International Peace Museum	Dayton	Montgomery	Southwest	Peace	
Dayton Visual Arts Center	Dayton	Montgomery	Southwest	Art	Gallery with changing exhibits
Decorative Arts Center of Ohio	Lancaster	Fairfield	Central	Art - Decorative arts	Located in the Reese-Peters House
Delhi Historical Society Farmhouse Museum	Delhi Township	Hamilton	Southwest	Local history	
Delphos Canal Commission Museum	Delphos	Allen	Northwest	Local history	Operated by the Delphos Canal Commission
Delphos Museum of Postal History	Delphos	Allen	Northwest	Postal	Postal history, stamps, letters, artifacts and the Holocaust
Denison Museum	Granville	Licking	Central	Art	Part of Denison University, works in many media from Asia, Europe, and North and Central America
Dennison Railroad Depot Museum	Dennison	Tuscarawas	Northeast	Railroad	Housed in an 1873 Pennsylvania Railroad depot, also features model train layout
DeWitt Log Homestead	Oxford	Butler	Southwest	Historic house	Operated by the Oxford Museum Association, early 19th-century log homestead
Dickens Victorian Village	Cambridge	Guernsey	Southeast	Living	Seasonal display of over 90 scenes of lifelike figures representing classic scenes from Victorian society
Dittrick Medical History Center	Cleveland	Cuyahoga	Northeast	Medical	Located at the Allen Memorial Medical Library on the campus of Case Western Reserve University
Dr. Bob's Home	Akron	Summit	Northeast	Historic house	Birthplace of Alcoholics Anonymous
Dr. Increase Mathews House	Zanesville	Muskingum	Southeast	Historic house	Operated by the Pioneer and Historical Society of Muskingum County
Doll Museum at the Old Rectory	Worthington	Franklin	Central	Toy	Operated by the Worthington Historical Society, 19th- and 20th-century dolls
Doty Homestead	Oxford	Butler	Southwest	Historic house	Operated by the Oxford Museum Association, mid-19th-century brick house, located in Hueston Woods State Park
Drake Planetarium and Science Center	Norwood	Hamilton	Southwest	Science	Located on the fourth floor of Norwood High School
Dunham Tavern Museum	Cleveland	Cuyahoga	Northeast	Historic building	Oldest building in Cleveland
Early House	Plain	Franklin	Central	Technology	Operated by the New Albany Plain Township Historical Society, open by appointment,
Early Television Museum	Hilliard	Franklin	Central	Technology	Early television receiver sets and accessories
East Palestine Historical Society Log House	East Palestine	Columbiana	Northeast	Historic house	1840 period log home
Edison Birthplace Museum	Milan	Erie	Northeast	Historic house	Birthplace of inventor Thomas Alva Edison
Elizabeth Township Historical Museum	Troy	Miami	Southwest	Local history	Operated by the Elizabeth Township Historical Society
Elizabeth's Dollhouse Museum	Bolivar	Tuscarawas	Northeast	Toy	Features collection of dollhouses
EnterTRAINment Junction	West Chester	Butler	Southwest	Railroad	Miniature railroad family center that includes American Railroading Museum, model railroad expo center, children's play area
Erb's Coleman Museum	Sugarcreek	Tuscarawas	Northeast	Commodity	Features over 3,000 Coleman Company items, including lanterns, gas cooking stoves, ice chests, irons, advertising
Ernie Hall Aviation Museum	Warren	Trumbull	Northeast	Aviation	Replica hangar and aviation school once operated by local aviator Ernie Hall, includes collectibles, displays, pictures, models and small aircraft
Euclid Historical Society & Museum	Euclid	Cuyahoga	Northeast	Local history	History of the Cleveland suburb of Euclid
Evelyn True Button House	McConnelsville	Morgan	Southeast	Historic house	Operated by the Morgan County Historical Society, 19th-century period home, includes the Doll House next door, a collection of dolls, and a carriage house and blacksmith shop
Fairport Harbor Marine Museum and Lighthouse	Fairport Harbor	Lake	Northeast	Maritime	Maritime museum and lighthouse
Famous Endings Museum	Dover	Tuscarawas	Northeast	Media	Operated by Toland-Herzig Funeral Home, autographs and photos of famous celebrities
Farmers’ Castle Museum Education Center	Belpre	Washington	Southeast	Local history	Operated by the Belpre Historical Society
Fawick Art Gallery	Berea	Cuyahoga	Northeast	Art	Part of the Kleist Center for Art & Drama at Baldwin Wallace University
Finnish Heritage Museum	Fairport Harbor	Lake	Northeast	Ethnic - Finnish American	Finnish heritage and culture
Firelands Museum	Norwalk	Huron	Northeast	Local history	Operated by the Firelands Historical Society
First Ladies National Historic Site	Canton	Stark	Northeast	History	Includes the historic home of Ida Saxton McKinley and exhibits about the First Ladies
Fitton Center for Creative Arts	Hamilton	Butler	Southwest	Art	Includes several free exhibition galleries
Flint Ridge State Memorial	Hopewell Township	Licking	Central	Native American	Restored prehistoric quarry pit and museum about the digging and shaping of flint
Follett House Museum	Sandusky	Erie	Northeast	Local history	Branch of the Sandusky Library, exhibits of local history
Fort Ancient	Lebanon	Warren	Southwest	Native American	Ancient Native American mounds and museum
Fort Firelands	Marblehead	Ottawa	Northwest	Fort	Recreated fort and Museum of Flint and Stone in an RV park
Fort Hill Earthworks & Nature Preserve	Oregonia	Highland	Southwest	Native American	Hopewell Culture earthworks and museum, 1,200-acre nature preserve
Fort Laurens	Bolivar	Tuscarawas	Northeast	Military	Museum and partial recreation of an American Revolutionary War fort
Fort Meigs	Perrysburg	Wood	Northwest	Military	Reconstructed early 19th-century fort and museum
Fort Recovery	Fort Recovery	Mercer	Northwest	Military	Museum about the American Revolutionary War fort
Fort Rowdy Museum	Covington	Miami	Southwest	Local history	Operated by the Covington-Newberry Historical Society, open by appointment and for special events
Fort Steuben	Steubenville	Jefferson	Northeast	Military	Reconstructed 1780s period fort
Fostoria Glass Heritage Gallery	Fostoria	Seneca	Northwest	Glass	Glassware produced by the over 10 glass companies in Fostoria from 1887–1920
Fowler Town Hall Museum	Fowler	Trumbull	Northeast	Local history	
Franklin Museum	New Athens	Harrison	Northeast	Local history	
Frank Museum of Art	Westerville	Franklin	Central	Art	Part of Otterbein University, art from Africa, Japan, and New Guinea; the University also includes the Miller and Fisher Galleries
Fredericktown Historical Museum	Fredericktown	Knox	Northeast	Local history	Operated by the Fredericktown Historical Society
Frostville Museum	North Olmsted	Cuyahoga	Northeast	Open air	Operated by the Olmsted Historical Society, includes 4 houses, a general store, two barns and a church
Fulton County Museum	Wauseon	Fulton	Northwest	Local history	Operated by the Fulton County Historical Society
Gahanna Historical Society Museums	Gahanna	Franklin	Central	Historic house	Includes the John Clark House and the Log House
Garst Museum	Greenville	Darke	Southwest	Local history	Includes exhibits on Annie Oakley and Lowell Thomas; operated by the Darke County Historical Society
Georgian Museum	Lancaster	Fairfield	Central	Historic house	1830s period mansion, operated by the Fairfield County Heritage Association, 1830s Federal mansion
Glendower Mansion	Lebanon	Warren	Southwest	Historic house	Operated by the Warren County Historical Society
Gnadenhutten Historical Park and Museum	Gnadenhutten	Tuscarawas	Northeast	Open air	History of the Gnadenhutten massacre in 1782
Gorman Heritage Farm	Evendale	Hamilton	Southwest	Farm	Heritage farm and outdoor education center
Goshen Historical Society Museum	Goshen	Clermont	Southwest	Local history	
Governor Bebb MetroPark & Pioneer Village	Okeana	Butler	Southwest	Open air	Historic log cabins, located in Governor Bebb MetroPark
Grant Birthplace	Point Pleasant	Clermont	Southwest	Historic house	Birthplace of President Ulysses S. Grant, operated by the Ohio History Connection
Grant Boyhood Home	Georgetown	Brown	Southwest	Historic house	Family home of President Ulysses S. Grant, operated by the Ohio History Connection
Grant Schoolhouse	Georgetown	Brown	Southwest	School	Early 19th-century school of President Ulysses S. Grant, operated by the Ohio History Connection
Granville Historical Society Museum	Granville	Licking	Central	Local history	
Great Western Schoolhouse	St. Clairsville	Belmont	Southeast	Education	Open by appointment, late 19th-century schoolhouse
Greater Buckeye Lake Historical Society Museum	Buckeye Lake	Licking	Central	Local history	Features Buckeye Lake Park memorabilia
Greater Cleveland Slow Pitch Softball Hall of Fame and Museum	Euclid	Cuyahoga	Northeast	Sports	
Greater Loveland Historical Society Museum	Loveland	Hamilton	Southwest	Historic house	
Greene County Ohio Historical Society Museum	Xenia	Greene	Southwest	Multiple	Complex includes Galloway Log House, Brantley Carriage House Museum and Victorian Town House
Guernsey County Historical Museum	Cambridge	Guernsey	Southeast	Local history	Late 19th-century McCracken-McFarland House containing antique furnishings, products and personal items from Guernsey County and its people
Hale Farm & Village	Bath Township	Summit	Northeast	Living	Operated by the Western Reserve Historical Society, 1860s village
Hancock Historical Museum	Findlay	Hancock	Northwest	Local history	Located in the Hull-Flater House
Hardin County Historical Museums	Kenton	Hardin	Northwest	Local history	Includes Sullivan-Johnson Museum, and the Hardin Historic Village and Farm, which is open by appointment seasonally
Harding Museum	Franklin	Warren	Southwest	Local history	Operated by the Franklin Area Historical Society, also operates the Franklin Post Office
Harmony Hill Historical Museum	Williamsburg	Clermont	Southwest	Historic house	Operated by the Clermont County Historical Society, open by appointment or events
Harris Dental Museum	Bainbridge	Ross	Southwest	Medical	Early 19th-century home, medical office, dental office, and dental school
Harrison Coal and Reclamation Historical Park	Cadiz	Harrison	Northeast	Mining	Outdoor display of surface mining vehicles and equipment
Harrison County History of Coal Museum	Cadiz	Harrison	Northeast	Mining	Located on the lower level of the Puskarich Public Library
Hawthorn Hill	Oakwood	Montgomery	Southwest	Historic house	Early 20th mansion of Wilbur and Orville Wright
Hefner Museum of Natural History	Oxford	Butler	Southwest	Natural history	Part of Miami University
Henry Barnhisel House	Girard	Trumbull	Northeast	Historic house	Operated by the Girard Historical Society
Henry Fearing House Museum	Marietta	Washington	Southeast	Historic house	Operated by the Washington County Historical Society, Victorian home
Heritage Hall Museum	Hamilton	Butler	Southwest	Local history	Includes Robert McCloskey exhibit
Hezekiah Dunham House	Bedford	Cuyahoga	Northeast	Historic house	1832 Georgian mansion operated by the Bedford Historical Society, furnishings reflect three periods of occupancy: 1840s, 1900 and 1950
Heritage Farm Museum	Brunswick	Medina	Northeast	Historic house	Operated by the Brunswick Area Historical Society, 1860s homestead
Heritage Hall	Marion	Marion	Northwest	Local history	Operated by the Marion County Historical Society
Heritage Village Museum	Sharonville	Hamilton	Southwest	Living	19th-century village, includes Kemper Log House
Hickories Museum	Elyria	Lorain	Northeast	Historic house	Operated by the Lorain County Historical Society, 1895 mansion interprets the lifestyle of a wealthy Lorain County family in the early 1900s
Hiestand Galleries	Oxford	Butler	Southwest	Art	Part of Miami University
Highland House Museum	Hillsboro	Highland	Southwest	Local history	Operated by the Highland County Historical Society
Hilliard Ohio Historical Society Museum	Hilliard	Franklin	Central	Multiple	Local history museum and open air historical village
Highlands Nature Sanctuary	Bainbridge	Highland	Southwest	Natural history	Private nature preserve, includes the Appalachian Forest Museum
Historic Kirtland Village	Kirtland	Lake	Northeast	Open air	Historic buildings and sites important to the early Latter Day Saint movement
Historic Lyme Village	Bellevue	Huron	Northeast	Open air	Includes John Wright Mansion, carriage house, schoolhouse, church, general store, log houses, barns, National Postmark Museum and more
Historical Society of Germantown Museum	Germantown	Montgomery	Southwest	Local history	Located in a former Carnegie library
Hoover Historical Center	North Canton	Stark	Northeast	Historic house	Part of Walsh University, history of The Hoover Company and its vacuum cleaners told in period settings
Hopewell Culture National Historical Park	Chillicothe	Ross	Southwest	Archaeology	Ancient Native American mounds and museum
Hower House	Akron	Summit	Northeast	Historic house	Part of University of Akron, Victorian mansion
Hubbard House Underground Railroad Museum	Ashtabula	Ashtabula	Northeast	Historic house	1841 period house with exhibits on the Underground Railroad and American Civil War
Huber Machinery Museum	Marion	Marion	Northwest	Agriculture	Located on the Marion County Fairgrounds, includes steam and gasoline tractors, threshers and road-building equipment
Huffman Prairie Flying Field	Fairborn	Greene	Southwest	Aviation	Part of Dayton Aviation Heritage National Historical Park, place where the Wright brothers worked to create a dependable, fully controllable airplane and trained themselves to be pilots
Iams Homestead Museum	Trotwood	Montgomery	Southwest	Historic house	Operated by the Trotwood-Madison Historical Society
Imagination Station	Toledo	Lucas	Northwest	Science	Over 300 hands-on science exhibits
Indian Museum of Lake County, Ohio	Mentor	Lake	Northeast	Native American	Features archaeological artifacts from last group of Indians, the Whittlesey people, to live in the area before the arrival of the Europeans
J. E. Reeves Victorian Home & Carriage House Museum	Dover	Tuscarawas	Northeast	Historic house	Operated by the Dover Historical Society, 17-room Victorian mansion and adjacent museum with carriages and other vehicles
James A. Garfield National Historic Site	Mentor	Lake	Northeast	Biographical	Home of President James Garfield
Jefferson County Historical Association & Museum	Steubenville	Jefferson	Northeast	Local history	
Jefferson Depot Village	Jefferson	Ashtabula	Northeast	Open air	Includes railroad depot, pharmacy, post office, general store and Victorian house
Jennie Munger Gregory Memorial Museum	Geneva on the Lake	Ashtabula	Northeast	Local history	Operated by the Ashtabula County Historical Society
John & Annie Glenn Historic Site	New Concord	Muskingum	Southeast	Living	Astronaut John Glenn's boyhood home recreated for the Depression and home front during World War II
John Scott Garbry Museum	Piqua	Miami	Southwest	Open air	Student center for Upper Valley JVS students majoring in the Environmental Occupations Program, includes classrooms, land laboratories and a replica of a town square featuring recreations of 19th-century shops, open by appointment
John P. Parker House	Ripley	Brown	Southwest	Historic house	Mid-19th-century home that was a stop on the Underground Railroad
John Rankin House	Ripley	Brown	Southwest	Historic house	Operated by the Ohio History Connection, home to abolitionist John Rankin and stop on the Underground Railroad
John Smart House	Medina	Medina	Northeast	Historic house	Operated by the Medina County Historical Society, Victorian house
John Stark Edwards House and Trumbull County Museum	Warren	Trumbull	Northeast	Historic house	Operated by the Trumbull County Historical Society, home of John Stark Edwards, depicts the lives of its residents from pioneer days to the late nineteenth century
John's Sweeper Service	Dover	Tuscarawas	Northeast	Commodity	Features collection of historic vacuum cleaners
Johnny Appleseed Educational Center & Museum	Urbana	Champaign	Southwest	Biographical	Part of Urbana University, memorabilia and written information about the life of Johnny Appleseed
Johnson-Humrickhouse Museum	Coshocton	Coshocton	Northeast	Multiple	Local history, Native American art and artifacts, American and European decorative arts, changing art exhibits
Johnson's Island Museum	Marblehead	Ottawa	Northwest	Civil War	History of Johnson's Island, POW camp during the Civil War
Johnston Farm and Indian Agency	Piqua	Miami	Southwest	Multiple	Includes John Johnston Farm, a museum of local and canal history, and canal rides
Joshua Reed Giddings Law Office	Jefferson	Ashtabula	Northeast	Historic house	Operated by the Ashtabula County Historical Society, early 19th-century law office of abolitionist Joshua Reeds Giddings
Karl Limper Geology Museum	Oxford	Butler	Southwest	Geology	Part of Miami University, ore minerals and meteorites
Keeper's House	Marblehead	Ottawa	Northwest	Historic house	Operated by the Ottawa County Historical Society, home of the first three lighthouse keepers for the oldest lighthouse in continuous operation on the Great Lakes
Kennedy Museum of Art	Athens	Athens	Southeast	Art	Part of Ohio University, collections include southwest Native American textiles, jewelry and contemporary collection of prints
Kennedy Stone House	Cambridge	Guernsey	Southeast	Historic house	Located in Salt Fork State Park
Kent State School of Art Galleries	Kent	Portage	Northeast	Art	Part of Kent State University School of Art, CVA, Downtown, Michener, Eells, and Student galleries
Kent State University Museum	Kent	Portage	Northeast	Multiple	Fashion and decorative arts
Kelso House Museum	Brimfield	Portage	Northeast	Historic house	Operated by the Brimfield Memorial House Association
Killbuck Valley Museum	Killbuck	Holmes	Northeast	Natural history	Animal skeletons, archaeological artifacts, geology specimens, local history
Kingwood Center	Mansfield	Richland	Northeast	Historic house	Botanical garden and mansion
Kirtland Temple	Kirtland	Lake	Northeast	Religious	Historic Mormon temple with museum
Knox County Historical Society Museum	Mount Vernon	Knox	Northeast	Local history	
Lake County History Center	Painesville Township	Lake	Northeast	Local history	
Lake Erie Islands Historical Society Museum	Put-in-Bay	Ottawa	Northwest	Local history	Operated by the Lake Erie Islands Historical Society
Lake Erie Islands Nature and Wildlife Center	Put-in-Bay	Ottawa	Northwest	Natural history	Formerly the Alaskan Wildlife Museum, collection of North American wildlife, fish and bird mounts
Lake Erie Nature & Science Center	Bay Village	Cuyahoga	Northeast	Nature center	Features live animals, natural history and science exhibits
Lake Metroparks Farmpark	Kirtland	Lake	Northeast	Farm	Working farm center, family oriented science and cultural center devoted to agriculture, farming, and country life
Lane-Hooven House	Hamilton	Butler	Southwest	Historic house	Octagon Gothic house
Langsdon Mineral Collection	Celina	Mercer	Northwest	Natural history	Rare minerals, located in the Mercer County Library, over 900 minerals from all over the world in 21 display cases
LeFevre Gallery	Newark	Licking	Central	Art	Part of Ohio State University, Newark Campus
Lenox Rural Museum	Jefferson	Ashtabula	Northeast	Local history	Includes general store and gas station, agriculture equipment
Liberty Aviation Museum	Port Clinton	Ottawa	Northwest	Aviation	Located at the Erie-Ottawa Regional Airport, also military and local history
Lillian E. Jones Museum	Jackson	Jackson	Southeast	Local history	
Lisbon Historical Society Museum	Lisbon	Columbiana	Northeast	Local history	
Little Red Schoolhouse	Bowling Green	Wood	Northwest	School	One room schoolhouse
Logan County History Center	Bellefontaine	Logan	Northwest	Multiple	Includes the Logan County Museum, Logan County Transportation Museum, and the Orr Mansion, operated by the Logan County Historical Society
Loghurst	Canfield	Mahoning	Northeast	Historic house	Early 19th-century log house, operated by appointment the Canfield Heritage Foundation
Lorain County History Center	Elyria	Lorain	Northeast	Local history	Operated by the Lorain County Historical Society in the Horace Starr House
Loveland Castle & Museum	Loveland	Hamilton	Southwest	Historic house	Also known as Chateau Laroche, folly of a historical European castle
Lowrie-Beatty Museum	Ravenna	Portage	Northeast	Local history	Operated by the Portage County Historical Society
Lucy Hayes Heritage Center	Chillicothe	Ross	Southwest	Historic house	Restored home of Lucy Webb Hayes, wife of President Rutherford B. Hayes
Mad River & NKP Railroad Museum	Bellevue	Huron	Northeast	Railroad	Railroad cars, equipment, tools, lanterns, uniforms, timetables, torches, buttons, badges, locks, silverware, china and linens and more
Mahler Museum & History Center	Berea	Cuyahoga	Northeast	Historic house	Operated by the Berea Historical Society in the Buehl House
Malabar Farm State Park	Lucas	Richland	Northeast	Multiple	Historic house and farm museum
Maltz Museum of Jewish Heritage	Beachwood	Cuyahoga	Northeast	Ethnic - Jewish	
Mansfield Art Center	Mansfield	Richland	Northeast	Art	
Mansfield Fire Museum	Mansfield	Richland	Northeast	Firefighting	
Mansfield Memorial Museum	Mansfield	Richland	Northeast	Local history	
MAPS Air Museum	Green	Summit	Northeast	Aviation	Located at the Akron-Canton Regional Airport
Marblehead Lighthouse Museum	Marblehead	Ottawa	Northwest	Maritime	Housed in the former residence of the lighthouse keepers in Marblehead Lighthouse State Park
Maria Stein Shrine of the Holy Relics	Fort Recovery	Mercer	Northwest	Religious	Collection of religious relics and Maria Stein Heritage Museum with pioneer life exhibits
Marion Union Station	Marion	Marion	Northwest	Railroad	Restored depot with collection of railroad memorabilia and the AC Tower, which was once the main switching facility for the Erie Railroad, Marion Division
Maritime Museum of Sandusky	Sandusky	Erie	Northeast	Maritime	History of boating, commercial fishing, and shipping on Lake Erie
Martin-Perry Homestead	Powell	Delaware	Central	Historic house	Operated by the Powell Liberty Historical Society, 1889 house with Victorian furnishings, artifacts and local memorabilia
Massillon Museum	Massillon	Stark	Northeast	Local history, art	Exhibits include miniature circus, Native American artifacts, period displays, changing art exhibits
Matamoras Area Historical Society Museum	Matamoras	Washington	Southeast	Local history	
Mayfield Township Historical Society Museum	Mayfield Township	Cuyahoga	Northeast	Historic house	Housed in the Bennett VanCuren Historical Home
Mazza Museum of International Art from Picture Books	Findlay	Hancock	Northwest	Art	Part of the University of Findlay, literacy and the art of children's picture books
McDonough Museum of Art	Youngstown	Mahoning	Northeast	Art	Part of Youngstown State University, contemporary art
McKinley Memorial Library, Museum & Birthplace Home	Niles	Trumbull	Northeast	Biographical	Memorial, museum and historic house museum of President William McKinley
Meeker Homestead Museum	Delaware	Delaware	Central	Historic house	Operated by the Delaware County Historical Society, early settlement period house
Melnick Medical Museum	Youngstown	Mahoning	Northeast	Science	Part of Youngstown State University, history of medicine (including dentistry, nursing, and pharmacy), especially as it relates to Youngstown and the Mahoning Valley from the 18th century to the present
Mercer County Historical Museum	Celina	Mercer	Northwest	Local history	
Merry-Go-Round Museum	Sandusky	Erie	Northeast	Amusement	Carousel horses and animals
Meigs County Museum	Pomeroy	Meigs	Southeast	Local history	Operated by the Meigs County Historical Society
Mentor Safety Village	Mentor	Lake	Northeast	Firefighting	Includes Mentor Fire Museum, Children's Safety House
Mercer-Smith Log House	Fairborn	Greene	Southwest	Historic house	Pioneer log cabin, open for events
Miakonda Museum	Toledo	Lucas	Northwest	Scouting	Located at Camp Miakonda, emphasis on Scouting history in the Erie Shores Council and its present and past camps
Miami University Art Museum	Oxford	Butler	Southwest	Art	Features 5 galleries of changing exhibitions, collections include paintings, sculpture and prints, Leica cameras and a sculpture park
Miami Valley Military History Museum	Dayton	Montgomery	Southwest	Military	Located in the former Putnam Library in the Historic District of the Dayton Veterans Affairs Medical Center. Displays begin with the Revolutionary War, and include the history of the National Home for Disabled Volunteer Soldiers (the "Soldiers Home", now the Dayton Veterans Affairs Medical Center), and continue through the Spanish–American War, both World Wars, Korea, Vietnam, the Cold War, Operations DESERT STORM, ENDURING FREEDOM and IRAQI FREEDOM and Military Operations Other Than War (MOOTW) such as Lebanon, Grenada, and Panama.
Miami Valley Veterans Museum	Troy	Miami	Southwest	Military	Supported by local veterans and community organizations, area veterans and military history
Middletown Canal Museum	Middletown	Butler	Southwest	Local history	Operated seasonally by the Middletown Historical Society
Mid-Ohio Historical Museum	Canal Winchester	Franklin	Central	Toy	Also known as Doll and Toy Museum, dolls, antique to modern, toys including Disney, trains, and circus collections
Milan Historical Museum	Milan	Erie	Northeast	Multiple	Six buildings include decorative arts, dolls and toys, tools, carriages, farm equipment, glass, local history, period rooms, 19th-century general store
Millersburg Glass Museum	Millersburg	Holmes	Northeast	Glass	Local glass, located on the campus of the Holmes County Cultural Center Campus
Minster Museum	Minster	Auglaize	Northwest	Local history	Operated by the Minster Historical Society
Monroe Historical Society Museum	Monroe	Butler	Southwest	Local history	
Monument Cabin	Hamilton	Butler	Southwest	Historic house	1804 log cabin in Monument Park
Moore House Museum	Lorain	Lorain	Northeast	Historic house	Operated by the Lorain Historical Society, 1920s period house
Morgan County Historical Society Museum	McConnelsville	Morgan	Southeast	Local history	Operated by the Morgan County Historical Society, also a doll museum
Motorcycle Hall of Fame	Pickerington	Fairfield	Central	Transportation - Motorcycle	Motorcycles, riding gear, memorabilia, important figures
Motts Military Museum	Groveport	Franklin	Central	Military	
Museum at the Friends Home	Waynesville	Warren	Southwest	Local history	Also known as the Waynesville Area Heritage & Cultural Center
Museum of American Porcelain Art	South Euclid	Cuyahoga	Northeast	Ceramics	
Museum of Biological Diversity	Columbus	Franklin	Central	Natural history (zoology and botany)	Located on the west campus of The Ohio State University
Museum of Ceramics	East Liverpool	Columbiana	Northeast	Art	Ceramic wares produced in and around East Liverpool
Museum of Divine Statues	Lakewood	Cuyahoga	Northeast	Religious	Ecclesiastical statues and other sacred artifacts
Museum of Spiritual Art	Franklin	Warren	Southwest	Religious Art	Private collection of religious art showcasing world religions
Museum of Troy History	Troy	Miami	Southwest	Local history	
Myers Inn Museum	Sunbury	Delaware	Central	Historic house	Operated by the Big Walnut Area Historical Society, early 19th-century inn and house
Myers School of Art Galleries	Akron	Summit	Northeast	Art	Part of University of Akron, Emily Davis Gallery and the Projects and Atrium galleries in Folk Hall
Nash House Museum	Delaware	Delaware	Central	Historic house	Operated by the Delaware County Historical Society, Victorian period house
National Afro-American Museum and Cultural Center	Wilberforce	Greene	Southwest	African American	Adjacent to Central State University, experiences of African Americans from their African origins to the present
National Aviation Hall of Fame	Riverside	Montgomery	Southwest	Hall of fame - Aviation - Military	Hosted within the National Museum of the United States Air Force at Wright-Patterson AFB
National Barber Museum and Hall of Fame	Canal Winchester	Franklin	Central	Industry	Barber profession artifacts, open by appointment, formerly the Ed Jeffers Barber Museum, operated by the Canal Winchester Area Historical Society
National Center for Nature Photography	Berkey	Lucas	Northwest	Art	Located in Secor Metropark, nature photography
National Construction Equipment Museum	Bowling Green	Wood	Northwest	Technology	Construction vehicles of all kinds, operated by the Historical Construction Equipment Association
National Heisey Glass Museum	Newark	Licking	Central	Glass	Operated by the Heisey Collectors of America, Heisey Glass Company glassware
National Imperial Glass Museum	Bellaire	Belmont	Southeast	Glass	Glass produced by Imperial Glassware
National Museum of Cambridge Glass	Cambridge	Guernsey	Southeast	Glass	Cambridge Glass glassware
National Museum of the Great Lakes	Toledo	Lucas	Northwest	Maritime	Maritime history of the Great Lakes, includes the Col. James M. Schoonmaker freighter museum ship
National Museum of the United States Air Force	Riverside	Montgomery	Southwest	Aviation	Located at Wright-Patterson AFB outside Dayton
National Packard Museum	Warren	Trumbull	Northeast	Automotive	Exhibits on Packard family, Packard Electric Company, Packard Motor Car and local history
National Road/Zane Grey Museum	Norwich	Muskingum	Southeast	Multiple	Exhibits on the National Road, author Zane Grey and Ohio art pottery, operated by the John & Annie Glenn Historic Site
National Voice of America Museum of Broadcasting	West Chester	Butler	Southwest	Media	Located in a former Voice of America facility, exhibits on radio and television
Nature Center at Shaker Lakes	Shaker Heights	Cuyahoga	Northeast	Natural history	
New Bremen Historical Museum	New Bremen	Auglaize	Northwest	Local history	Operated by the New Bremen Historic Association in the mid-19th-century William Luelleman House
New Indian Ridge Museum	Amherst	Lorain	Northeast	Archaeology	
New Knoxville Heritage Center	New Knoxville	Auglaize	Northwest	Historic house	Operated by the New Knoxville Historical Society, includes a late 19th-century house, doctor's office, log house and standalone kitchen building
North Canton Heritage Society Museum	North Canton	Stark	Northeast	Local history	
Northern Ohio Railway Museum	Chippewa Lake	Medina	Northeast	Railroad	Streetcars and other railroad equipment
Oak Hill Cottage Museum	Mansfield	Richland	Northeast	Historic house	Victorian home, operated by the Richland County Historical Society
Oberlin Heritage Center	Oberlin	Lorain	Northeast	Open air	Includes Monroe House, the Little Red Schoolhouse, and the Jewett House
OH WOW!	Youngstown	Mahoning	Northeast	Science	AKA Roger & Gloria Jones Children's Center for Science & Technology, hands-on science and technology exhibits for children
Ohio Glass Museum	Lancaster	Fairfield	Central	Glass	Pressed and blown glass objects from Ohio glass manufacturers
Ohio Governor's Mansion	Bexley	Franklin	Central	Historic house	1920s mansion and garden, home to the Governor of Ohio since 1957
Ohio Railway Museum	Worthington	Franklin	Central	Railroad	
Ohio River Museum	Marietta	Washington	Southeast	Maritime	Operated by the Ohio History Connection, transportation and natural history of the Ohio River
Ohio State Reformatory	Mansfield	Richland	Northeast	Prison	Late 19th-century prison in use until 1990
Ohio Tobacco Museum	Ripley	Brown	Southwest	Industry	Tobacco farming and production
Ohio Valley River Museum	Clarington	Monroe	Southeast	Local History	
Ohio's Small Town Museum	Ashville	Pickaway	Central	Local history	Operated by the Ashville Area Heritage Society
Old Brick Museum	Orwell	Ashtabula	Northeast	Local history	Operated by the Old Brick Historical Society
Old Carnegie Library Museum	Pickerington	Fairfield	Central	Local history	Operated by the Pickerington-Violet Township Historical Society
Old Main Street Museum	Newcomerstown	Tuscarawas	Northeast	Local history	Operated by the Newcomerstown Historical Society, replica of an early 1900s village holds twenty-three storefronts
Old Town Jail Museum	Ashville	Pickaway	Central	Local history	Operated by the Village of Ashville.
Oldest Stone House Museum	Lakewood	Cuyahoga	Northeast	Historic house	Operated by the Lakewood Historical Society, 1834 house
Olin's Museum of Covered Bridges	Ashtabula	Ashtabula	Northeast	Commodity - Covered bridges	History, photos, art, and artifacts about covered bridges
Oliver Tucker Museum	Beverly	Washington	Southeast	Historic house	Operated by the Lower Muskingum Historical Society, 1850s log house
Orange Johnson House	Worthington	Franklin	Central	Historic house	Operated by the Worthington Historical Society, 19th-century period home
Orton Geological Museum	Columbus	Franklin	Central	Natural history (geology and paleontology)	Located in Orton Hall on the campus of The Ohio State University; the oldest natural history museum in Ohio, maintains a large collection of minerals, rocks, and fossils
Our House Tavern	Gallipolis	Gallia	Southeast	Historic house	Operated by the Ohio History Connection, 1819 tavern
Ourant's School	Deersville	Harrison	Northeast	School	1873 one-room schoolhouse, open for events and programs
Overfield Tavern Museum	Troy	Miami	Southwest	Historic site	Furnished in mid-19th-century Ohio antiques
Painesville Railroad Museum	Painesville	Lake	Northeast	Railroad	Operated by the Western Reserve Railroad Association, open for events
Parry Park Museum	Woodsfield	Monroe	Southeast	Local history	Open by appointment with the Monroe County Historical Society, includes the Hollister-Parry House Museum, Oak Ridge-Byers One Room School House, and the Yaussey-Winkler Cooperative Dairy
Patterson Homestead	Dayton	Montgomery	Southwest	Historic house	19th-century house
Paul Laurence Dunbar House	Dayton	Montgomery	Southwest	Biographical	Part of Dayton Aviation Heritage National Historical Park
Pencil Sharpener Museum	Logan	Hocking	Southwest	Collection	Largest collection of pencil sharpeners in the United States.
Pennsylvania House Museum	Springfield	Clark	Southwest	Historic house	Early 19th-century house and tavern, operated by the Lagonda Chapter of the Daughters of the American Revolution
Peoples Mortuary Museum	Marietta	Washington	Southeast	Automotive	Historic automobiles and hearses, operated by Cawley & People's Funeral Homes
Perkins Stone Mansion	Akron	Summit	Northeast	Historic house	Mid-19th-century mansion, operated by The Summit County Historical Society of Akron, Ohio
Perry County Historical Society	Somerset	Perry	Southeast	Local history	1840 house with exhibits on American Civil War, Native Americans, Perry County art pottery
Perry Historical Museum	Perry	Lake	Northeast	Local history	Operated by the Perry Historical Society of Lake County
Philip Moore Jr. Stone House	West Portsmouth	Scioto	Southwest	Historic house	Early 19th-century house, open on select days
Piatt Castles	West Liberty	Logan	Northwest	Historic house	Two mid-19th-century chateaux open for tours
Pickwick Building Museum	Middletown	Butler	Southwest	Local history	Operated by the Middletown Historical Society
Pike Heritage Museum	Waverly	Pike	Southwest	Local history	
Piqua Historical Museum	Piqua	Miami	Southwest	Local history	
Plain City Historical Society Museum	Plain City	Madison	Southwest	Local history	
Polka Hall of Fame	Euclid	Cuyahoga	Northeast	Hall of fame - Dance - Polka	History of the Cleveland-style polk
Presidential Museum	Williamsfield	Ashtabula	Northeast	History	Exhibits on every U.S. President
Pro Football Hall of Fame	Canton	Stark	Northeast	Hall of fame - Sports - Football	
Promont House Museum	Milford	Clermont	Southwest	Historic house	Operated by the Greater Milford Area Historical Society, 3-story Victorian Italianate mansion
Prospect Place	Trinway	Muskingum	Southeast	Historic house	Mid-19th-century mansion
Putnam County Historical Society Museum	Kalida	Putnam	Northwest	Local history	
Pyramid Hill Sculpture Park & Museum	Hamilton	Butler	Southwest	Art	265-acre (1.07 km^{2}) sculpture park and outdoor museum
Quaker Heritage Center	Wilmington	Clinton	Southwest	Religious	Part of Wilmington College
Quaker Yearly Meeting House	Mount Pleasant	Jefferson	Northeast	Religious	1814 meeting house
Quigley Museum	Amherst	Lorain	Northeast	Historic house	Operated by the Amherst Historical Society, 1832 house
Radnor Historic Museum	Radnor	Delaware	Central	Local history	Operated by the Radnor Heritage Society
Ragersville Historical Society	Ragersville	Tuscarawas	Northeast	Local history	Museum and one room schoolhouse
Reynoldsburg-Truro Historical Society Museum	Reynoldsburg	Franklin	Central	Local history	
Richard Ross Museum of Art	Delaware	Delaware	Central	Art museum	Part of Ohio Wesleyan University
Richland County Museum	Lexington	Richland	Northeast	Local history	
Ripley Museum	Ripley	Brown	Southwest	Local history	1850s home featuring 10 rooms with collectibles dating from the late 18th century up to the mid-20th century
River Museum	Wellsville	Columbiana	Northeast	Historic house	Operated by the Wellsville Historical Society
Robbins Crossing	Nelsonville	Athens	Southeast	Living	Operated by Hocking College, 19th-century village
Robbins Hunter Museum	Granville	Licking	Central	Historic house	Greek Revival Avery Downer House with 14 rooms furnished with 18th- and 19th-century decorative arts, operated by the Licking County Historical Society
Rombach Place Museum	Wilmington	Clinton	Southwest	Local history	Home of General James W. Denver, features Victorian furnishings, local history and art; operated by the Clinton County Historical Society
Roscoe Village	Coshocton	Coshocton	Northeast	Living	Restored 19th-century canal village, also features the Johnson-Humrickhouse Museum
Rose Hill Museum	Bay Village	Cuyahoga	Northeast	Historic house	Operated by the Bay Village Historical Society, furnishings from the Colonial and Victorian periods
Ross County Heritage Center	Chillicothe	Ross	Southwest	Local history	Operated by the Ross County Historical Society, site includes the 1820s Knoles Log House and the Franklin House with exhibits of local women's history
Ross Historical Center	Sidney	Shelby	Northwest	Local history	Operated by the Shelby County Historical Society
Ross-Gowdy House	New Richmond	Clermont	Southwest	Historic house	Operated by the New Richmond Historical Society, 1853 house
Rossville Museum	Piqua	Miami	Southwest	African American	1869 house built by former slave, open by appointment
Rutherford B. Hayes Presidential Center	Fremont	Sandusky	Northeast	Biographical	Includes Presidential library, Hayes Museum and Spiegel Grove
Salem Historical Museum	Salem	Columbiana	Northeast	Local history	Operated by the Salem Historical Society
Samuel Spitler House Community Museum	Brookville	Montgomery	Southwest	Historic house	Operated by the Brookville Historical Society
Sandstone Museum Center	Amherst	Lorain	Northeast	Open air	Operated by the Amherst Historical Society
Sandusky County Historical Society Museum	Fremont	Sandusky	Northeast	Historic house	
Sauder Village	Archbold	Fulton	Northwest	Living	Turn-of-the-20th-century rural village with craftsmen, historic houses, farm and more
Sayler-Swartsel House	Eaton	Preble	Southwest	Local history	Operated by the Preble County Historical Society
Schoenbrunn Village	New Philadelphia	Tuscarawas	Northeast	Open air	Operated by the Ohio History Connection, reconstructed village with seventeen buildings
Schumacher Gallery	Bexley	Franklin	Central	Art	Part of Capital University, located on the fourth floor of The Blackmore Library
Scio Historical Museum	Scio	Harrison	Northeast	Local history	
Sedgwick House Museum	Martins Ferry	Belmont	Southeast	Local history	Operated by the Martins Ferry Area Historical Society
Serpent Mound	Peebles	Adams	Southwest	Archaeology	Prehistoric effigy mound, museum and park
Shaker Heights Historical Society Museum	Shaker Heights	Cuyahoga	Northeast	Religious	
Shandy Hall	Geneva	Ashtabula	Northeast	Historic house	Early 19th-century house, operated by appointment with the Western Reserve Historical Society
Shanes Crossing Historical Museum	Rockford	Mercer	Northwest	Local history	
Sherman House Museum	Lancaster	Fairfield	Central	Historic house	19th-century home of U.S. senator John Sherman and General William Tecumseh Sherman, operated by the Fairfield Heritage Association
Sherwood-Davidson House Museum	Newark	Licking	Central	Historic house	Operated by the Licking County Historical Society
Shunk Museum	Crestline	Crawford	Northwest	Local history	Operated by the Crestline Historical Association. New Crestline Historical Museum opened in 2019.
Snook's Dream Cars	Bowling Green	Wood	Northwest	Automotive	Historic cars in recreated settings including a 1940s Texaco gas station, 1930s general store and 1960s race track
Southeast Ohio History Center	Athens	Athens	Southeast	Local history	Settlement of Ohio, operated by the Athens County Historical Society
Southern Ohio Museum	Portsmouth	Scioto	Southwest	Art	Focus on Ohio and regional art, Clarence Holbrook Carter and over 10,000 prehistoric Native American objects
Spiegel Grove	Fremont	Sandusky	Northeast	Historic house	Also known as Rutherford B. Hayes Home, part of Rutherford B. Hayes Presidential Center
Spirit of 76 Museum	Wellington	Lorain	Northeast	Local history	Operated by the Southern Lorain County Historical Society
Springboro Museum Center	Springboro	Warren	Southwest	Local history	Former stop on the Underground Railroad
Springfield Museum of Art	Springfield	Clark	Southwest	Art	
Spring Hill	Massillon	Stark	Northeast	Historic house	1820s rural home once a stop on the Underground Railroad
Squire Rich Museum	Brecksville	Cuyahoga	Northeast	Local history	Operated by the Brecksville Historical Association, 1840s house
Stan Hywet Hall and Gardens	Akron	Summit	Northeast	Historic house	Notable country estate with gardens
Stearns Homestead	Parma	Cuyahoga	Northeast	Open air	Operated by the Parma Area Historical Society, includes 1855 Stearns House, 1920 Gibbs House, country store and farm
Stein Galleries	Fairborn	Greene	Southwest	Art	Part of Wright State University
Stengel True Museum	Marion	Marion	Northwest	Local history	Civil War–era mansion with local history collection. As of 11-2021, no regular hours of operation.
Stone Academy	Zanesville	Muskingum	Southeast	Local history	Operated by The Pioneer and Historical Society of Muskingum County
Strock Stone House	Austintown	Mahoning	Northeast	Historic house	Operated by the Austintown Historical Society
Strongsville Historical Village	Strongsville	Cuyahoga	Northeast	Open air	Operated by the Strongsville Historical Society, recreated 19th-century village
SunWatch Indian Village	Dayton	Montgomery	Southwest	Native American	Recreated 13th-century Native American village
Susie's Museum of Childhood	Carrollton	Carroll	Northeast	Toy	Includes dolls, teddy bears and toys, located in Bluebird Farm Park
Sutliff Museum	Warren	Trumbull	Northeast	Local history	Victorian furnished room on the second floor of the Warren-Trumbull County Public Library
Ted Lewis Museum	Circleville	Pickaway	Central	Biographical	Musician Ted Lewis
Temperance Tavern	Newcomerstown	Tuscarawas	Northeast	Local history	Operated by the Newcomerstown Historical Society, 1841 tavern, features dress collection, Woody Hayes and Cy Young memorabilia, military artifacts
Terhune Art Gallery	Perrysburg	Wood	Northwest	Art	Part of Owens Community College in the Center for Fine and Performing Arts
Tiffin Glass Museum	Tiffin	Seneca	Northwest	Glass	Features Tiffin Glass Company glassware
Tippecanoe Historical Society Museum	Tipp City	Miami	Southwest	Local history	
Toledo Firefighters Museum	Toledo	Lucas	Northwest	Firefighting	
Toledo Museum of Art	Toledo	Lucas	Northwest	Art	Features large glass collection, plus extensive collection of European and American painting
Toledo, Lake Erie and Western Railway Museum	Grand Rapids	Wood	Northwest	Railway	Heritage railroad and museum
Town Hall Museum	Bedford	Cuyahoga	Northeast	Local history	Main museum of the Bedford Historical Society
Toy and Doll Museum of Marietta	Marietta	Washington	Southeast	Toy	
Toy and Plastic Brick Museum	Bellaire	Belmont	Southeast	Toy	Features Lego projects
Tri-State Warbird Museum	Batavia	Clermont	Southwest	Aviation	Restored World War II aircraft
Trotwood Depot Museum	Trotwood	Montgomery	Southwest	Railroad	Operated by the Trotwood-Madison Historical Society
Troy-Hayner Cultural Center	Troy	Miami	Southwest	Art	Changing art exhibits, permanent exhibit about the Hayner Distillery Company
TV Dinner Club Museum	Akron	Summit	Northeast	Media	Art and artifacts of mid-20th-century American TV
Twinsburg Historical Society Museum	Twinsburg	Summit	Northeast	Local history	
Tyler History Center	Youngstown	Mahoning	Northeast	Local history	Operated by the Mahoning Valley Historical Society
Uhrichsville Clay Museum	Uhrichsville	Tuscarawas	Northeast	Decorative art	Folk art created by clay workers in their spare time and other ceramic items
Underground Railroad Museum	Flushing	Belmont	Southeast	History	Slavery and the Underground Railroad in Ohio
Union Township Heritage Association	West Milton	Miami	Southwest	Local history	Located in a Quaker meeting house, includes area Quaker history
Upton House	Warren	Trumbull	Northeast	Historic house	19th-century home of suffragette Harriet Taylor Upton
Uniopolis Historical Museum	Uniopolis	Auglaize	Northwest	Local history	Operated by the Uniopolis Historical Society
Van Wert County Historical Society	Van Wert	Van Wert	Northwest	Open air	Includes the Clark Mansion, barn with agriculture exhibits, one room schoolhouse, log house
Versailles Area Museum	Versailles	Darke	Southwest	History	Operated by the Versailles Area Historical Society, local history
Veterans Memorial Museum	Germantown	Montgomery	Southwest	Military	WWII artifacts, uniforms, medals, photos, weapons
Victorian House Museum	Millersburg	Holmes	Northeast	Local history	Victoriana and Holmes County history, in the Brightman House
Victorian Perambulator Museum	Jefferson	Ashtabula	Northeast	Commodity	More than 200 antique baby carriages
Ving Tsun Museum	Dayton	Montgomery	Southwest	Sports	History of Ving Tsun kung fu
WACO Aircraft Museum	Troy	Miami	Southwest	Aviation	Operated by the WACO Historical Society, focus on Waco Aircraft Company airplanes
Walton House Museum	Centerville	Montgomery	Southwest	Local history	Operated by the Centerville-Washington Township Historical Society
Wapakoneta Museum	Wapakoneta	Auglaize	Northwest	Local history	Operated by the Auglaize County Historical Society
Ward-Thomas Museum	Niles	Trumbull	Northeast	Historic house	Operated by the Niles Historical Society, includes mannequins wearing life-size replicas of the First Ladies’ gowns
Warren County History Center	Lebanon	Warren	Southwest	Local history	More than 30 exhibits on three floor levels, operated by the Warren County Historical Society in Harmon Hall
Warren G. Harding House	Marion	Marion	Northwest	Biographical	Operated by the Ohio History Connection, also known as Harding Home and Museum
Warther Museum	Dover	Tuscarawas	Northeast	Decorative art	Wood and ivory carvings, particularly steam trains, created by Ernest “Mooney” Warther, a button collection, Swiss gardens, family home and original workshop, and arrowhead collection
War Vet Museum	Canfield	Mahoning	Northeast	Military	Also features model railroad
W. C. Moorhead Museum	Dover	Tuscarawas	Northeast	Scouting	Located at Camp Tuscazoar, history of Camp Tuscazoar and area scouting
Webb House Museum	Newark	Licking	Central	Historic house	Operated by the Licking County Historical Society
Welsh-American Heritage Museum	Oak Hill	Jackson	Southeast	Ethnic	Area Welsh heritage and culture, operated by the University of Rio Grande, open by appointment
Weltzheimer/Johnson House	Oberlin	Lorain	Northeast	Historic house	Designed by Frank Lloyd Wright
Westcott House	Springfield	Clark	Southwest	Historic house	Designed by Frank Lloyd Wright
Wheeling & Lake Erie Depot	Bedford	Cuyahoga	Northeast	Railroad	1920s passenger station with railroad artifacts and displays, operated by the Bedford Historical Society
Whitehouse Historical Society Museum	Whitehouse	Lucas	Northwest	Local history	
Wilderness Trail Museum	Fort Loramie	Shelby	Northwest	Local history	Operated by the Fort Loramie Historical Association
Wildwood Manor House	Toledo	Lucas	Northwest	Historic house	Georgian Colonial mansion, also Oak Grove Schoolhouse
William H. McGuffey House	Oxford	Butler	Southwest	Historic house	Part of Miami University, also exhibits about William Holmes McGuffey
William McKinley Presidential Library and Museum	Canton	Stark	Northeast	Multiple	Includes McKinley National Memorial, Presidential memorabilia, period room displays, local businesses, street of shops, Discover World science center, planetarium, robotic dinosaur and model railroad; operated by the Stark County Historical Society
William Rainey Harper Log House	New Concord	Muskingum	Southeast	Historic house	1834 log house
Windsor Historical Society Museum	Windsor	Ashtabula	Northeast	Local history	Located in a former Episcopal church
Wolcott House Museum Complex	Maumee	Lucas	Northwest	Open air	Includes the 19th-century Wolcott House, an 1841 saltbox farmhouse, an 1850 log house, an 1880 railroad station with box car and caboose, and a 1901 Gothic style country church; operated by the Maumee Valley Historical Society
Wolf Creek Grist Mill	Loudonville	Ashland	Northeast	Mill	Historic grist mill
Wood County Museum	Bowling Green	Wood	Northwest	Local history	
The Works	Newark	Licking	Central	Multiple	Science, glass art and history
Wright B Flyer Hangar	Miamisburg	Montgomery	Southwest	Aviation	Replica of the original Wright Brother's Huffman Prairie hangar and their aircraft
Wyandot Popcorn Museum	Marion	Marion	Northwest	Food	Operated by the Marion County Historical Society, popcorn poppers and peanut roasters
Xenia Station	Xenia	Greene	Southwest	Local history	
Yoder's Amish Home	Millersburg	Holmes	Northeast	Farm	Historic Amish farm
Youngstown Historical Center of Industry and Labor	Youngstown	Mahoning	Northeast	Industry	History of the steel industry
Youngstown State University Mineral Museum	Youngstown	Mahoning	Northeast	Science	Located in Moser Hall, includes fossils, dinosaur eggs, minerals and crystals
Zane Shawnee Caverns	Jefferson Township	Logan	Northwest	Native American	Cave and Shawnee Woodland Native American Museum
Zanesville Museum of Art	Zanesville	Muskingum	Southeast	Art	
Zoar Village	Zoar	Tuscarawas	Northeast	Open air	Operated by the Ohio History Connection

== Defunct museums ==
- American Gas Pump Heaven, Dover, closed in 2016
- America's Ice Cream & Dairy Museum, Medina, closed in 2010
- Cleveland Health Museum, AKA HealthSpace Cleveland, merged in 2007 with the Cleveland Museum of Natural History
- Degenhart Paperweight and Glass Museum, Cambridge, closed in 2011, portion of the collection relocated to the Museum of American Glass located in Weston, West Virginia
- Ely Chapman Foundation West African Museum, Marietta
- Hauck House Museum, Cincinnati, no longer open as a museum
- Hopalong Cassidy Museum, Cambridge, destroyed by fire in 2016
- Inland Seas Maritime Museum, Vermilion, closed in 2012 in as the Great Lakes Historical Society prepares to open the National Museum of the Great Lakes in Toledo, Ohio, in 2013
- Kern-Harrington Museum, Plain Township, formerly operated by the New Albany-Plain Township Historical Society
- Lake Shore Electric Railway
- Little Italy Heritage Museum, closed in 2007
- Marietta Soda Fountain & Museum, Marietta
- National Cartoon Museum - This was not originally in Ohio, but, once it failed, its collection was merged with the Billy Ireland Cartoon Library & Museum at The Ohio State University
- National Inventors Hall of Fame, Akron, moved to Alexandria, Virginia
- Sara Rose Museum, Sabina
- Trapshooting Hall of Fame & Museum, Vandalia, moved to Sparta, Illinois
- USS Radford National Naval Museum, Newcomerstown, closed in 2011, contents now at the USS Orlect Naval Museum in Lake Charles, Louisiana
- Viets House Museum, Cortland, formerly operated by the Cortland-Bazetta Historical Society, closed in 2011
- Western Reserve Model Railroad Museum, Mentor, closed in 2011

== Regions ==
The regional column in the table features designations used by the Ohio Museum Association:

- Central – including Columbus
- Northeast – including Cleveland
- Northwest – including Toledo
- Southeast
- Southwest – including Cincinnati and Dayton

== See also ==
- List of historical societies in Ohio
- Nature centers in Ohio
