= Heisey =

Heisey is a surname. Notable people with the surname include:

- A. H. Heisey (1842–1922), American businessman
- Alan Heisey (born 1954), Canadian lawyer
- Alan Milliken Heisey Sr. (1928–2014), Canadian writer, politician and activist
- Chris Heisey (born 1984), American baseball player
- Karl Brooks Heisey (1895–1937) Canadian mining engineer
- Lawrence Heisey (1930–2009), Canadian businessman and philanthropist
- Monica Heisey, Canadian writer

== See also ==
- Heisey Glass Company, defunct American glassmaking company
- Heisey House, historic house in Lock Haven, Pennsylvania, United States
