= Overmyer–Waggoner–Roush Farm =

- U.S. National Register of Historic Places
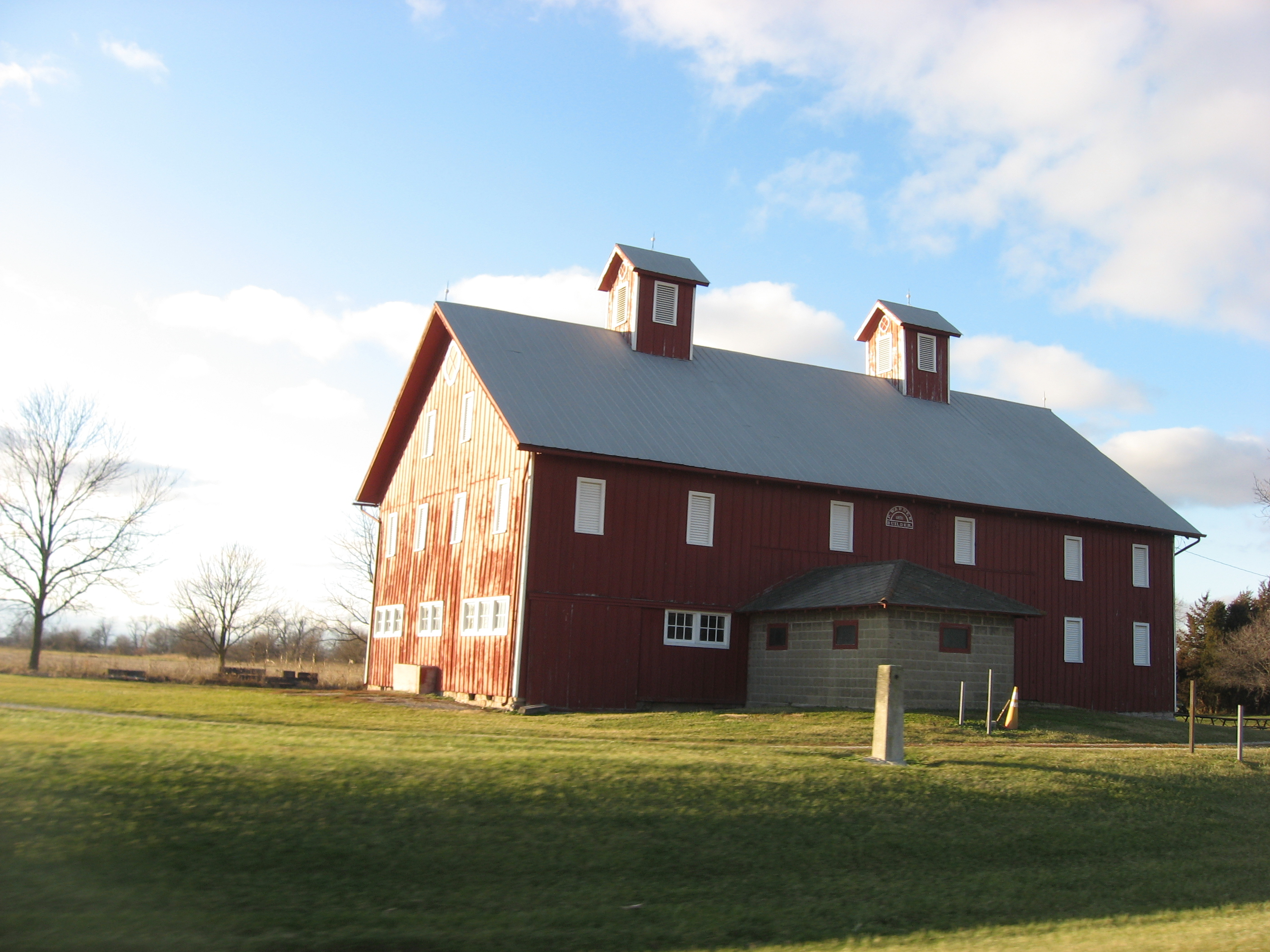
- One of the barns at the farm

- Location within Ohio Location within the United States
- Location: 654 S. Main St., Lindsey, Ohio
- Coordinates: 41°24′39″N 83°13′38″W
- Area: 187 acres (76 ha)
- Built: 1862
- Architect: Phillip C. Overmeyer
- Architectural style: Greek Revival, Gothic Revival
- NRHP reference No.: 83002055
- Added to NRHP: September 8, 1983

The Overmyer–Waggoner–Roush Farm (also known as "Creek Bend Farm") is a historic farmstead on the southern edge of the village of Lindsey in the northwestern part of the U.S. state of Ohio. Composed primarily of buildings constructed in the middle of the nineteenth century, it has been converted into a park and designated a historic site.

== Active farmstead ==
A family of Overmyers departed one of the German principalities to settle in Pennsylvania in 1751. One of the sons of this family, Phillip A. Overmyer, was born in 1823; after moving with his family to Washington Township in Sandusky County, Ohio at the age of ten, he married Margaret Waggoner in 1848, who had moved to the same vicinity in 1830. Besides farming, Phillip operated a sawmill and engaged in wagonmaking for many years. In 1862, the Overmyers erected a farmhouse on the present property; constructed of brick, it was built in the popular Greek Revival style of architecture. The family also arranged for the construction of barns and several other buildings on their property; seven historic buildings remain to the present day, including at least one that features elements of Gothic Revival architecture.

By the beginning of the twentieth century, the Overmyer farm had passed into the ownership of a new family, the Roushes; this family owned the property and operated the farm for more than a century while transitioning from traditional draft animal power to modern mechanized equipment such as tractors. Before his 1999 death, family head Robert Roush operated the farm; his interests in conservation led him to attempt innovative techniques, such as establishing a tree farm and plowing his fields in circles to avoid damage to those fields.

== Conversion ==
In 2004, Robert's widow Frances agreed to donate the farm to Sandusky County for conversion into a county park; besides the land and buildings, the donation included family journals and money to restore two dilapidated barns. Local officials welcomed the chance to convert the property into a park, due to its conservation potential. Among their premier interests was the tree farm: they saw it as significant because Roush had established it at a time when the typical Ohio farmer saw woodlots as nuisances that needed to be removed in order to make use of vacant land. This recognition was not the first that had been accorded to the farm: it was listed on the National Register of Historic Places in 1983, qualifying both because of its place in local history and because of its distinctive architecture — historians saw it as one of the area's best preserved nineteenth-century German family farms.

After the donation was made, the Sandusky County Park District announced plans to build a visitor center on the property and to convert farmland along Muddy Creek into wetland, as well as restoring the farm's barns. Plans were announced to begin a program of historic farming: a local antiquarian group made arrangements to begin farming parts of the property with early twentieth-century equipment and to use modern equipment on other parts, in order to demonstrate technological change over the century.

Presently measuring 310 acres (130 ha), the site is in the process of being developed by the Park District to resemble a farm of the 1930s through the 1950s. Although access to the buildings is restricted, visitors are free to hike on marked trails. Other activities sponsored by the Park District at the site include skiing, geocaching, nature watching, and metal detecting.

In 2007, the Park District removed thirty-one ash trees from the property that were expected to be devastated by the Emerald ash borer, like others in northwestern Ohio. After milling, the wood was used as replacement flooring in the barn.
