= Harrison County History of Coal Museum =

Museum in Cadiz, Ohio

The Harrison County History of Coal Museum, also known as the Puskarich Coal Museum, is a non-profit educational museum featuring information about coal mining. It opened in May 1994 in Cadiz, Ohio in the lower level of the Puskarich Public Library. The museum is open during the libraries' normal business hours from Monday - Thursday 9:00-8:00, Friday 9:00-6:00, and Saturday 9:00-5:00. Tours can be arranged by appointment. Admission is free of charge.

== Museum information ==
Different displays and photographs of various mining memorabilia inside the coal museum are available for viewing. The 99-seat theater offers film presentations of the coal industry and its history. Some of the topics featured are:

=== Mining in general ===
Coal's geological history, the history of coal mining in the United States, how mines were built, coal in the environment and products with items ranging from insecticides made from creosote coal tar to mothballs, a distillate of coal tar. Coal samples depicting anthracite (hard coal) are also displayed. Many of the displays were donated by area collectors as well as those associated with the mining industry. Elizabeth Reeb, a researcher-curator with the Ohio Historical Society, is responsible for many museum exhibits and photos.

=== Underground mining ===
The actual mining process with its machines and methods, a general history of the United Mine Workers of America and safety are included here. Miners' tools and equipment (hats, lunch buckets, safety devices) are acquired for displays. The safety device display covers the gamut from the old-fashioned birdcage - when the death of the bird meant the presence of deadly gases - to today's self-contained rescuer kits with a one-hour oxygen supply. The biggest display is a thirties-forty-era Watt Car located in the centerpiece of the lobby area. It was donated to the museum by the Cravat Coal Company. It stands in front of a huge photo of the entrance to a deep mine. The museum's walls and ceiling are set in black to give the underground feel of a deep mine.

=== Surface mining ===
Machines and equipment like the Silver Spade and Giant Earth Mover (GEM), reclamation, and a model of a surface mine operation are key components. Among the displayed pieces is a broken-off "tooth" from the gigantic bucket of Consolidation Coal Company's Silver Spade and a section of the three-inch-thick electrical cable used to switch it on.

=== Local mining ===
Harrison County was a top coal-producing county in Ohio. The general history of mining in this county and Eastern Ohio is covered by Ida Mae Stull. She was nationally recognized as the country's first woman coal miner, to the decline of the industry during the 1980s. Items from local mines are also on display. Other displays include several watch fobs, famous then and now, representing various coal equipment companies. The old "company store" is also featured with examples of merchandise and "scrip", both paper and metal.

== Available videos ==
Besides the many books offered at the Puskarich Public Library, the library and coal museum offer videos about coal mining.

- Coal: the Inside Story
- Fighting Coal Mine Fires
- Mountaineer Prep Plant Big Muskie
- Last Pony Mine - Longwall Mining
- Marion Video
- The Other Half Speaks - Daron Coal Company/Atlas Power Company - Adventures in Strip-mining
- Common Ground Modern Mining
- Energy Under Ground - Y & O Coal Company
- Salute to the Giant
- Out of Darkness
- All About Coal (children's version)
- History of Bucyrus Erie Strip-Mining Shovels
