= Fort Firelands =

Frontier fort recreation in Lakeside-Marblehead, Ohio, U.S.

Coordinates: 41°31′58″N 82°49′40″W

Fort Firelands is a recreation of a 19th-century-style frontier fort located in Lakeside-Marblehead, Ohio, United States. It was built in 1968 with the original construction including stockade fencing, corner blockhouses with gun ports, and barracks. A pioneer village and early western-style museum were some of the original attractions.

Today, what remains of the original structures are being repaired and rehabilitated. An RV resort is located behind the fort complex.

Renewed interest in the unique, neo-historical structure is being shown and events are again to be held in the fort complex. Several postcards were issued that illustrate the initial construction.

== Museum of Flint and Stone ==
On the grounds of Fort Firelands, there is a Museum of Flint and Stone which has examples of various types of hand crafted stone tools and weapons. Displaying both antique as well as modern versions of arrowheads, drills, and axes, the museum attempts to preserve the techniques that create these tools.
