= Ourant's School =

- U.S. National Register of Historic Places
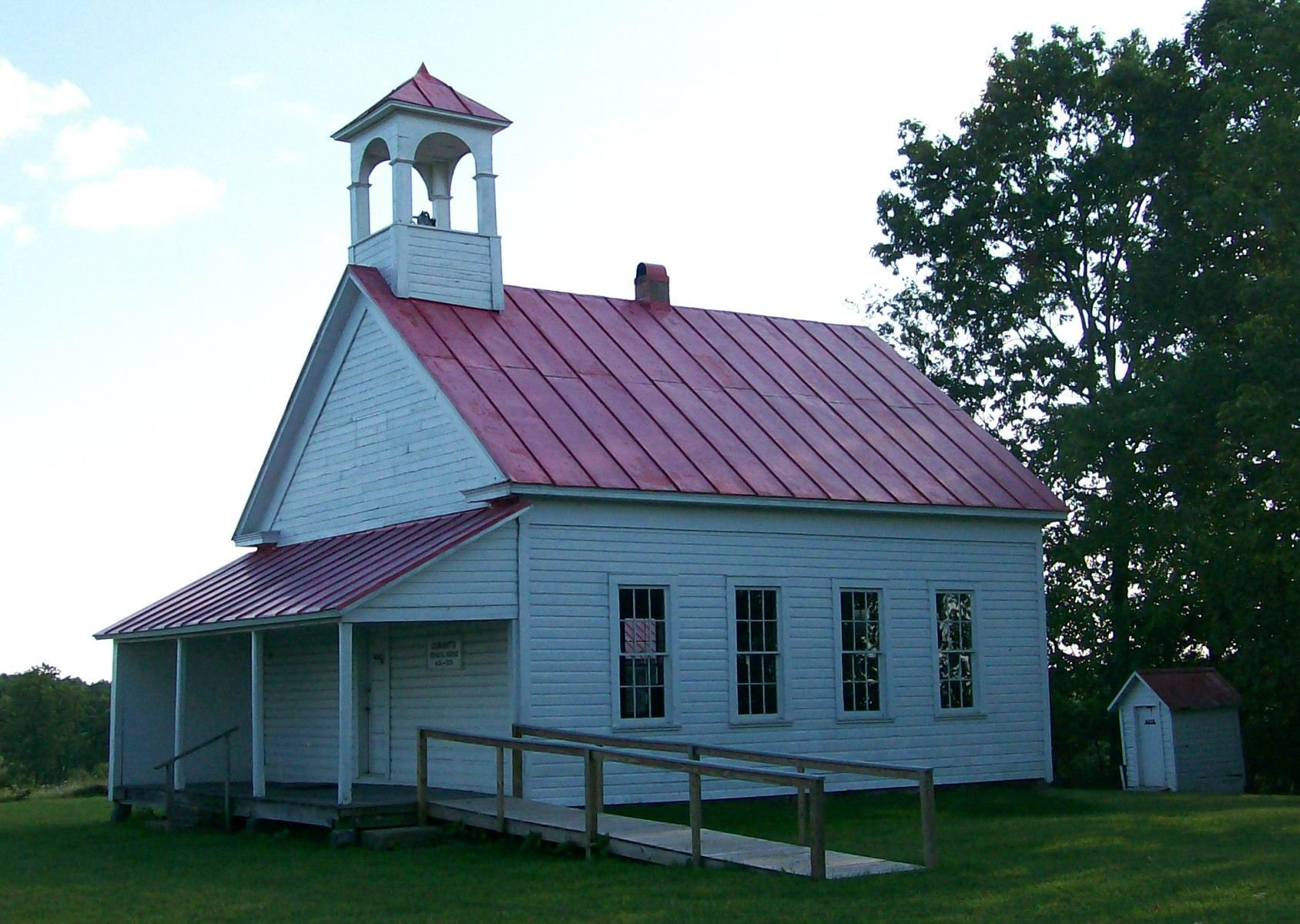
- Ourant's School in Harrison County, Ohio

- Location within Ohio Location within the United States
- Nearest city: Cadiz, Ohio
- Coordinates: 40°17′14″N 81°07′36″W
- Area: less than one acre
- Built: 1873
- Architectural style: One-room schoolhouse
- NRHP reference No.: 94000241
- Added to NRHP: March 17, 1994

Ourant's School is a one-room schoolhouse located on Ourant Road, east of Deersville, Ohio. The schoolhouse was placed on the National Register on 1994-03-17.

== History ==
The schoolhouse was built in 1873 and served the community until 1941. The schoolhouse was purchased by its alumni until it was renovated and restored by Crossroads RC&D. It was then turned over to the Ourant School Memorial Association which maintains the property and currently awards a scholarship to students in the area. The schoolhouse still operates in an educational sense, as each spring a class of second graders spends a day in the one-room setting.

== Exterior ==
The schoolhouse is a simple building constructed of whitewashed boards on a sandstone slab foundation. The entrance is contained in a covered porch with four support posts lining the front facade. The renovations added a wheelchair ramp to the side. The sides of the building contains four double-sashed windows with 12 panels in each window. The high gabled roof supports a square drum with arched openings and capped by a pointed roof. The original school bell is located in the tower with its mountings. A small brick chimney protrudes from the roof in the center of the structure.

The schoolhouse is surrounded by three support buildings, including the boys and girls necessaries, as well as a storage building. These were restored at the same time as the schoolhouse.

== Interior ==
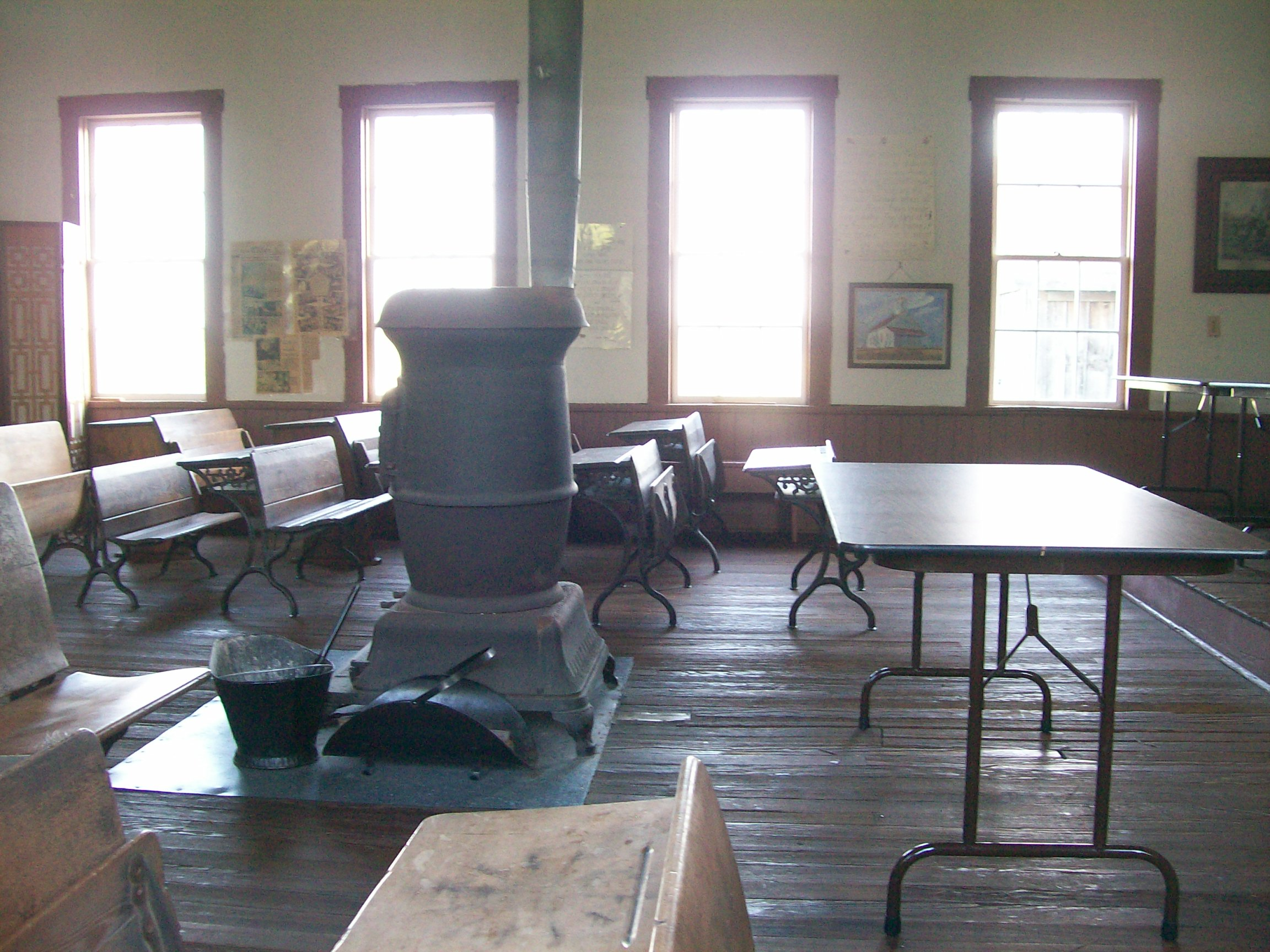
The interior of Ourant's School, with the potbelly stove center-frame.

The interior of the schoolhouse is furnished with pieces from the 1870s, including the iron worked legs on the oak-top school desks and the large potbelly stove in the center of the room. The coal bucket and scoop are located close to the stove. The teachers desk is located on a dais with a large blackboard behind the teachers desk.
