= Samuel Augspurger Farm =

Historic house in Ohio, United States

- U.S. National Register of Historic Places
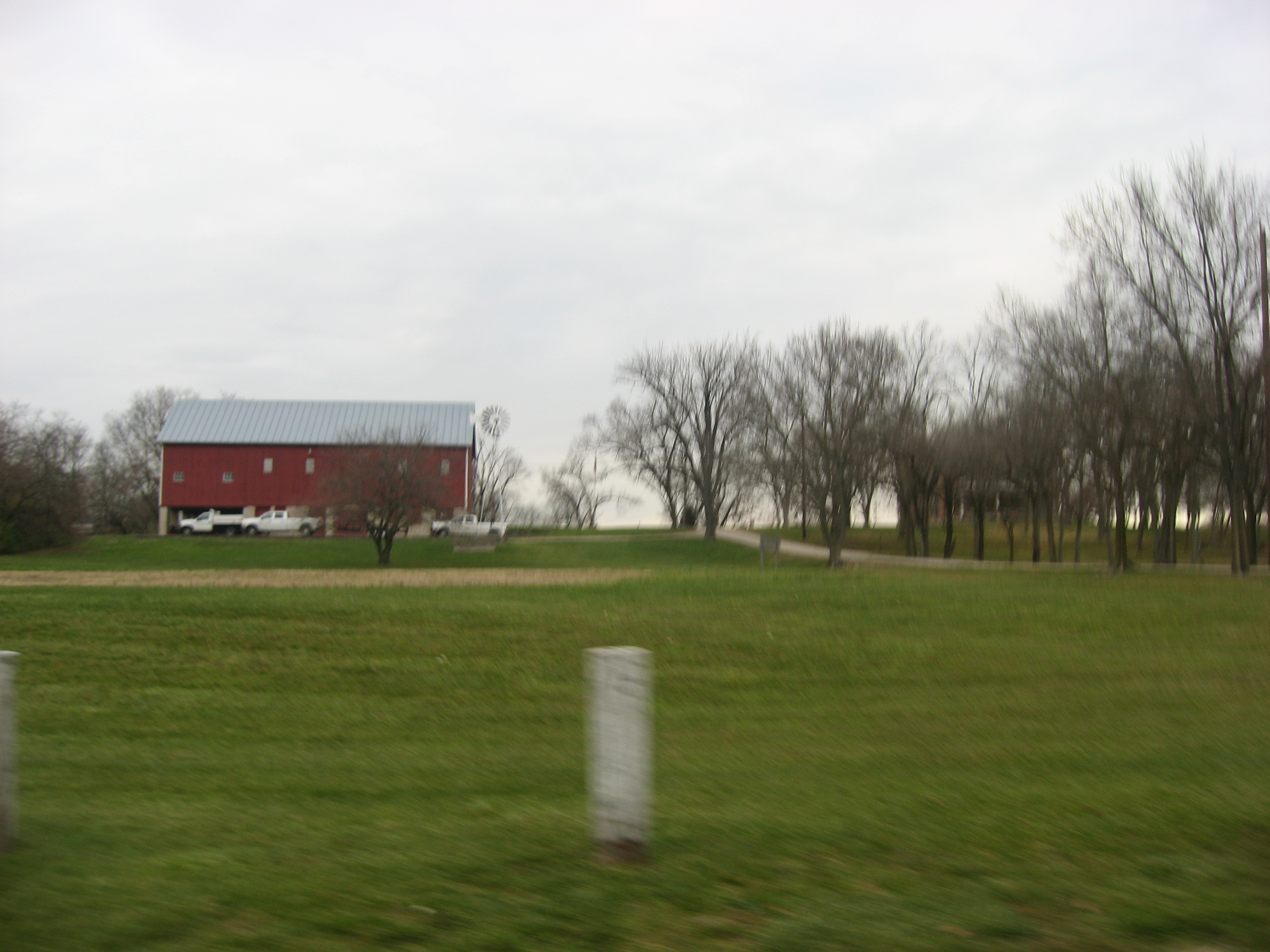
- Roadside view

- Location within Ohio
- Nearest city: Trenton, Ohio
- Coordinates: 39°26′28.27″N 84°27′50.36″W
- MPS: Augspurger Amish/Mennonite Settlement TR
- NRHP reference No.: 84000209
- Added to NRHP: 1984-11-01

Samuel Augspurger Farm is a historic building near Trenton, Ohio, listed on the National Register of Historic Places in 1984.

The farmhouse, barn, family cemetery and 17 acres are now owned by Butler County Metroparks and operated as a museum known as the Chrisholm Historic Farmstead.

== Historic uses ==
- Single Dwelling - 1874 farmhouse.
- Cemetery
- Agricultural Outbuildings, including the Rosemont Barn.
