= The Castle (Marietta, Ohio) =

Historic house in Ohio, United States

- U.S. Historic district – Contributing property
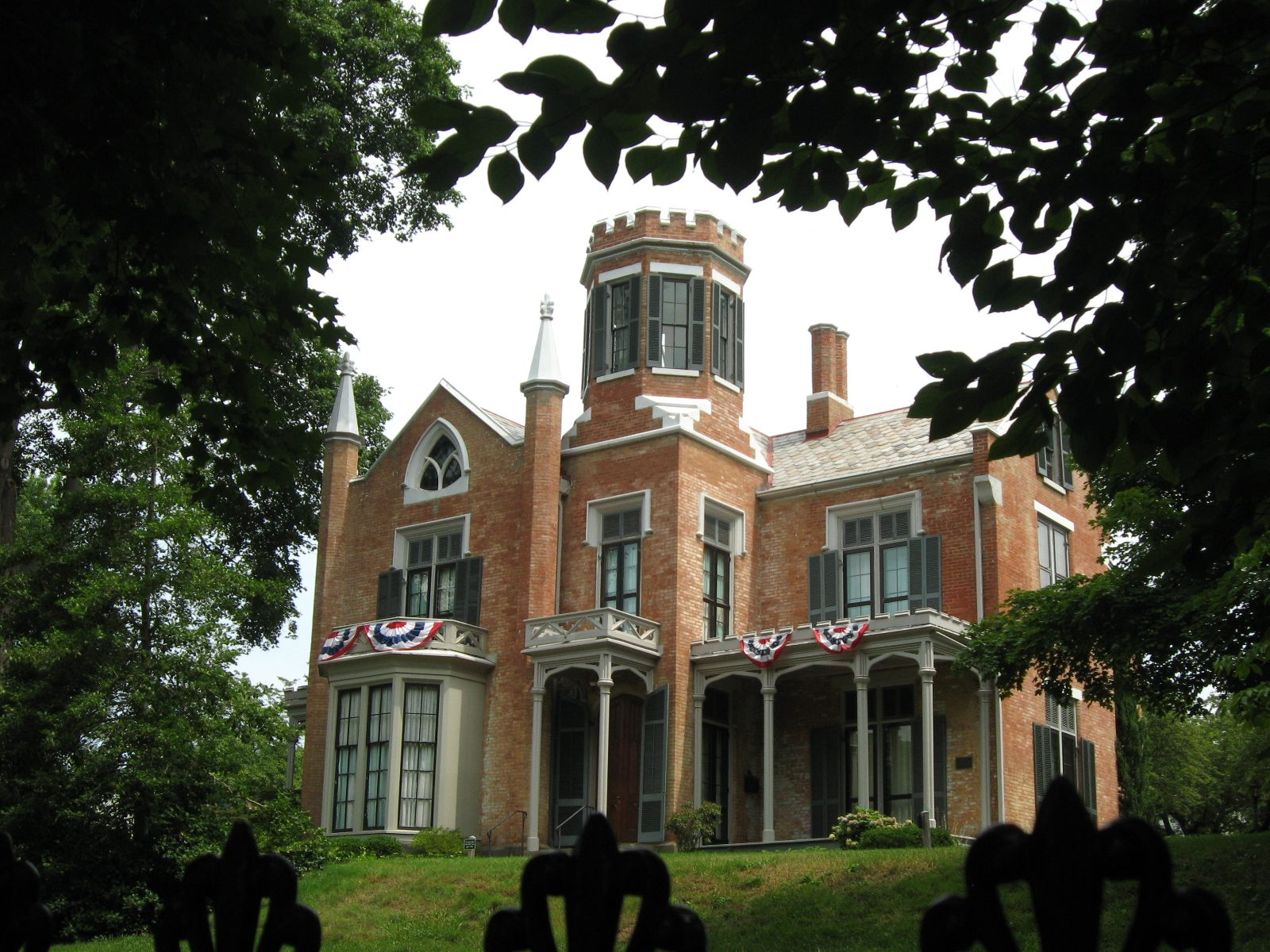
- The Castle in Marietta, Ohio

- Location within Ohio Location within the United States
- Location: Marietta, Ohio
- Coordinates: 39°25′14″N 81°27′18″W
- Built: c. 1855
- Architectural style: Gothic Revival
- Part of: Marietta Historic District (ID74001646)
- Designated CP: December 19, 1974

The Castle is a historic Gothic Revival style home in Marietta, Ohio, USA.

Since 1994 it has been operated as museum.
