= Brightman House =

- U.S. National Register of Historic Places
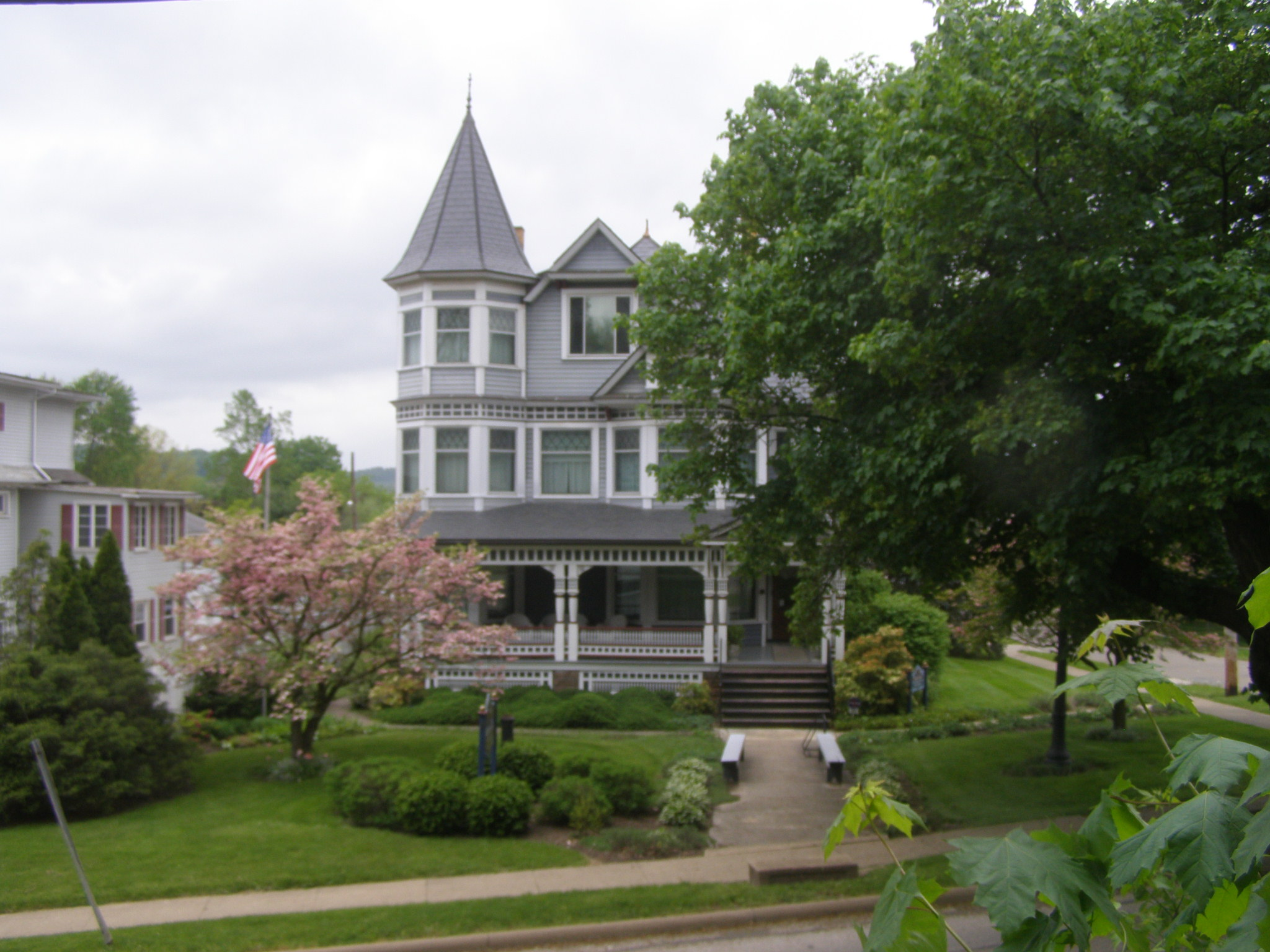
- Brightman House (484 Wooster Road), Millersburg, Ohio

- Location within Ohio Location within the United States
- Interactive map showing the location of Brightman House
- Location: 484 Wooster Rd Millersburg, Ohio
- Coordinates: 40°33′34″N 81°54′55″W
- Area: 0.8 acres (0.32 ha)
- Built: 1903
- Architectural style: Queen Anne
- NRHP reference No.: 74001528
- Added to NRHP: October 29, 1974

The Brightman House is a historical house in Millersburg, Ohio first built in 1902. The house is now owned by the Holmes County Historical Society and operated as the Victorian House Museum, with displays of Victoriana and Holmes County history.

== History ==
L. H. Brightman completed his 28-room Queen Anne style home in 1902. Brightman was an industrialist from Cleveland, who brought his second wife, Mary and eight of his twelve children (born to him and his first wife, Elizabeth - died 1897) to Millersburg. By 1906, his business had grown so large that he left Millersburg and the house was purchased by a group of doctors who opened a sanatorium. This lasted only an additional two years when H.C. Lee of Griggs and Lee Construction moved his family into the house. The Lee family lived here until 1971 when it was purchased by the Holmes County historical society. It currently houses the Museum of Victoriana and collection of Holmes County history.

During the 1890s there was an expansion of residential properties as the farm surrounding Millersburg produced increasing quantities of wheat and oats (1895 and 1897). As the volume of farm products increased, the merchants in town sold more farm machinery and shipped the produce (grain, eggs, and wool) improving their profits from year to year. Light manufacturing came to Millersburg in the form of a brick and tile company, the Brightman Manufacturing Company, an iron and steel shafting company. This increase in commercial and industrials growth provided the cash for more homes and larger homes. The village improved its infrastructure with a municipal waterworks. The Alfred Peters House and William Rudy House on East Jackson are from this early 1890s period. Peters (harness maker) and Rudy (hardware) were merchants in the downtown.

== See also ==
- Millersburg Glass Company
