= Firelands Museum =

Coordinates: 41.2421°N 82.6178°W

The Firelands Museum in Norwalk, Ohio is the oldest operating museum in the state of Ohio. It was founded by the Firelands Historical Society and began collecting artifacts in 1857. Many founders of the society were pioneers from the Connecticut Western Reserve (or their immediate ancestors).

In 1899, the Dr. Kittredge house on the site of the present Norwalk Public Library was purchased to house the museum. With a monetary contribution from steel magnate Andrew Carnegie, the library building opened in 1905. The historical museum was housed on the ground floor at that time, where the historical society celebrated its golden anniversary in 1907. By 1953 the museum had grown crowded and a new location was pursued. The Preston-Wickham mansion on West Main Street was to be torn down for a new commercial building, and the society rallied to buy it and move the oldest part behind the library. Samuel Preston built the house in 1834. He was the founder of the Norwalk Reflector newspaper, which was published in the house for several years.

The house was thoroughly renovated and opened to the public as the Firelands Historical Society's headquarters and museum in May 1957, the society’s centennial. A half-block down Case Avenue from the main museum, the society bought and opened the building in 1988 which now houses more exhibits, a research center and meeting room. Included in the exhibits are various organs and pianos made by the A.B. Chase Piano Company, a Norwalk firm which operated from about 1876 to 1930. Another treasure is their impressive collection of hundreds of antique pistols and rifles, many of which were donated by Norwalk business leader George Titus.
