= The Pioneer and Historical Society of Muskingum County =

Pioneer and Historical Society of Muskingum County
- Predecessor: Muskingum County Pioneer Association; Old Settlers Association
- Formation: 4 March 1890
- Type: Non-profit
- Purpose: Preserving the history of the Zanesville and Muskingum County region of Ohio
- Location: 115 Jefferson Street, Zanesville, OH 43701
- Services: Maintains historical documents and large, representative collection of Weller Pottery. Operates Dr. Increase Mathews House and Stone Academy
- Website: muskingumhistory.org

The Pioneer and Historical Society of Muskingum County, also known as the Zanesville Historical Society, is an organization located in Zanesville, Ohio, in the United States, with the mission of preserving the history of the Zanesville and Muskingum County region of Ohio. It is a non-profit entity which operates several important historic sites in and around the Zanesville, Ohio, area, including the Dr. Increase Mathews House, built in 1805 by a founder of the town; and the Stone Academy, erected in 1809 as a possible state capitol, which was also a meeting place for abolitionist societies, and once the home of writer Elizabeth Robins, who wrote about it. The Pioneer and Historical Society of Muskingum County received a Preservation Merit Award from the Ohio Historic Preservation Office Award in 1993 for its work restoring and preserving the Stone Academy.

It is one of the oldest historical societies in the state, chartered March 4, 1890, as the successor organization to the Muskingum County Pioneer Association and the Old Settlers Association. It was reorganized in 1924, and exhibitions were re-opened to the public in Memorial Hall.

The Society maintains a vast number of historical documents. Among these are the journal and papers of Dr. Mathews, a pioneer who first explored the area in 1798. The papers were presented to the Society in 1943 by a descendant. The society also has the papers of Thomas Merritt (born 1759), a New Englander who was commissioned to serve in the loyalist Queen's Rangers in 1782 in the American Revolution, and who served as a Major of Canadian forces in the War of 1812. The Society owns documents such as land grants or military commissions signed by George Washington, John Adams, Thomas Jefferson, James Monroe and Abraham Lincoln.

The world's "largest and most representative collection" of Weller art pottery was donated to the Society in 1958. Weller operated in Zanesville until 1948.
