= McCracken-McFarland House =

Historic house in Ohio, United States

- U.S. National Register of Historic Places
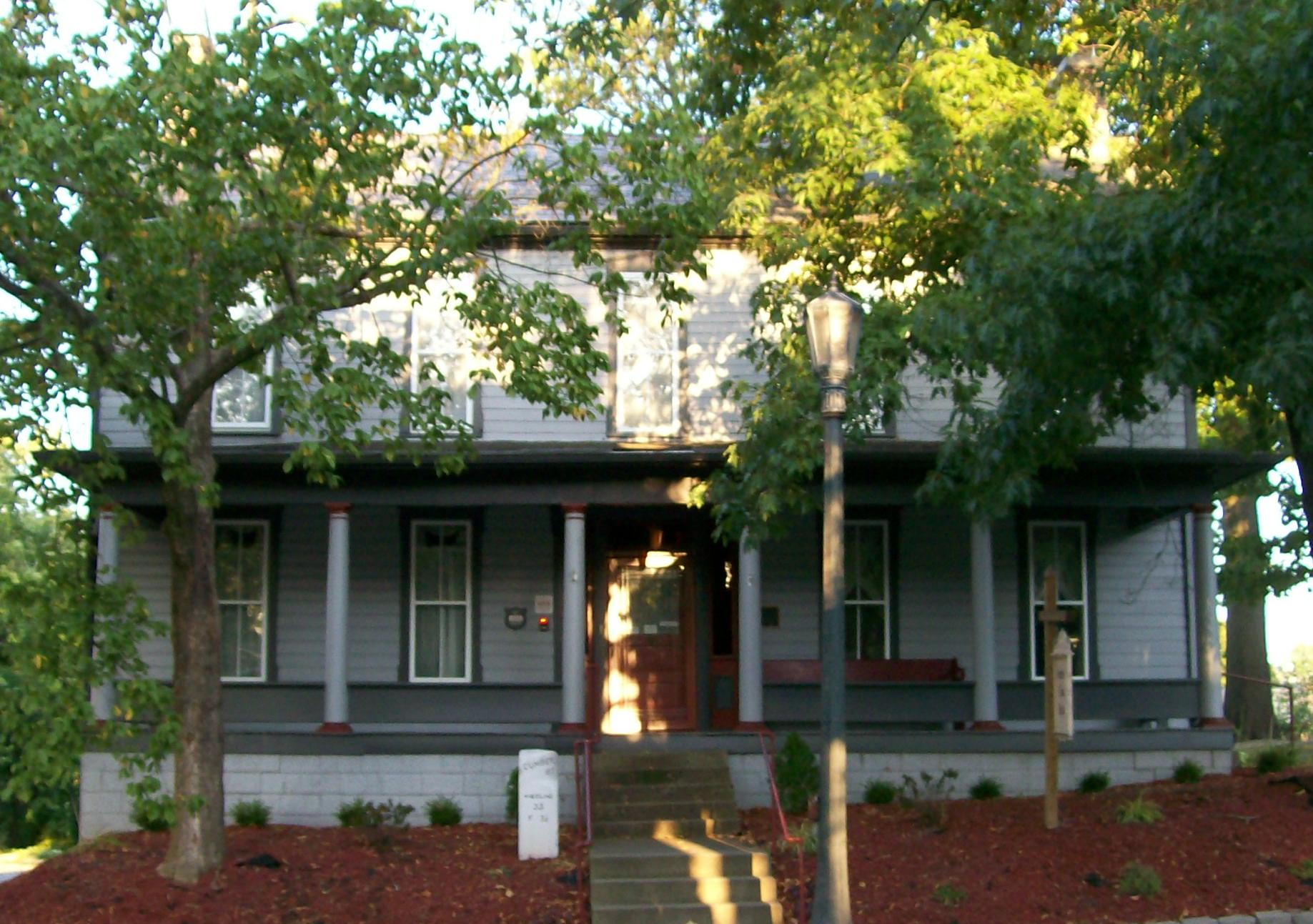
- Front of the house

- Location within Ohio Location within the United States
- Location: 216 N. 8th St., Cambridge, Ohio
- Coordinates: 40°1′36″N 81°35′23″W
- Area: Less than 1 acre (0.40 ha)
- Built: 1825
- Architectural style: Greek Revival
- NRHP reference No.: 79001848
- Added to NRHP: February 16, 1979

The McCracken-McFarland House is a historic house built in 1825 in the city of Cambridge, Ohio, United States. It was once home to one of the city's political leaders, and later a Presbyterian minister. Few extant buildings in the city can compare to it architecturally, and it has been named a historic site.

William McCracken settled in Cambridge in 1809 at the age of twenty-two. Although he began his residency as a simple blacksmith, McCracken later made himself into one of the most prominent members of local society. McCracken arranged for the construction of the present house, built in 1825, but his wealth was sufficient to pay for the erection of a brick house in the same neighborhood in 1830. Two years later, William McFarland was born in New Athens. At the age of twenty-five, he was ordained as a minister in one of the denominations that later formed the United Presbyterian Church of North America. McFarland moved to Cambridge in 1860 to pastor its United Presbyterian congregation, soon taking possession of the house, and it remained the property of the McFarland family until his daughter conveyed it to the Guernsey County Historical Society in 1966. Since that time, the society has converted the house into its museum.

Greek Revival in style, the McCracken-McFarland House is a weatherboarded structure with a slate roof. It sits slightly above the sidewalk; one must climb two small sets of steps to attain the six-columned porch on the front of the house. Both stories of the facade are divided into five bays, with windows in all except for the center of the first story; this place is occupied by the main entrance, its transom light, and its sidelights. The gabled roof is topped with a chimney on either end of the roofline. Although the Greek Revival influence is present, the house is primarily a vernacular structure, retaining a settlement-period mode of design with few extant parallels in the city.

In early 1979, the McCracken-McFarland House was listed on the National Register of Historic Places, qualifying both because of its architecture and because of its place as the home of William McCracken. Among the other National Register-listed locations in Cambridge is the McCracken-Scott House, the brick house that William McCracken had built in 1830.
