= Windsor Mills Christ Church Episcopal =

- U.S. National Register of Historic Places
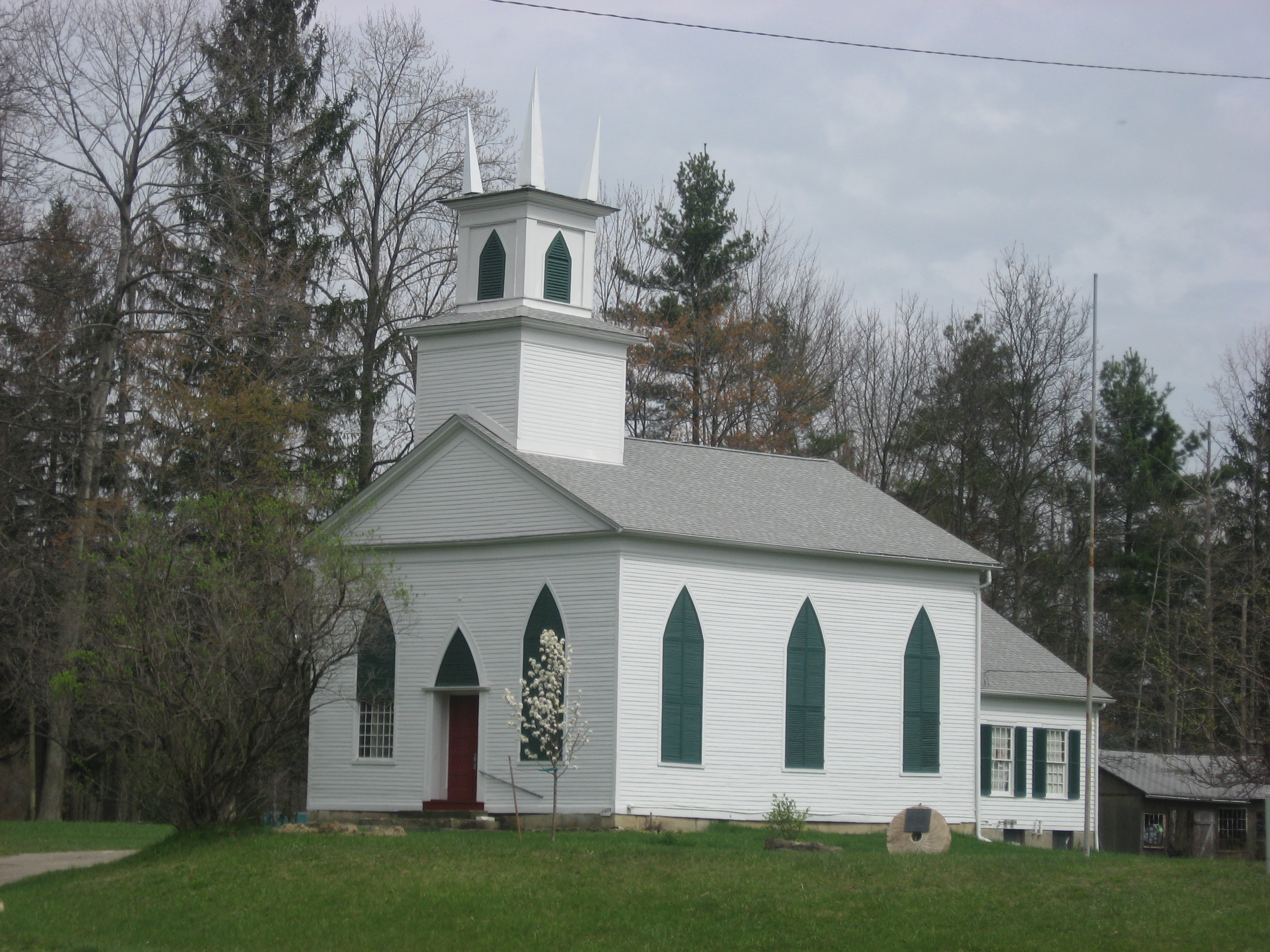
- Front and southern side

- Location within Ohio Location within the United States
- Location: Wisell Rd. and U.S. Route 322, Windsor Township, Ashtabula County, Ohio
- Coordinates: 41°32′9″N 80°57′43″W
- Area: Less than 1 acre (0.40 ha)
- Built: 1832
- Architectural style: Greek Revival
- NRHP reference No.: 75001319
- Added to NRHP: May 29, 1975

Windsor Mills Christ Church Episcopal is a historic former church building in Windsor Township, Ashtabula County, Ohio, United States. Built in the 1830s, it features a distinctive combination of two different architectural styles, and it has been named a historic site.

Windsor Township's first Protestant Episcopal society was established in 1816, and pioneer settler Solomon Griswold donated the resources to build its first building north of Windsor Center. It served the parish for a comparatively short time, and the present structure replaced it in 1832, although at a different location west of Windsor Center. At the time, the Greek Revival style was in vogue, but when this style fell out of favor and the Gothic Revival replaced it in the popular imagination, Christ Church was updated accordingly. More architectural work was performed in 1961, as extensive interior renovations were performed with such success that the project was recognized by the American Institute of Architects. Since that time, it has ceased to be a church, with a museum becoming the building's new occupant.

The former Christ Church is a weatherboarded structure combining the influences of the Greek and Gothic Revival styles. Tall pointed windows are placed around the rectangular building, with a central main entrance on the facade. The roof rises to a gable at each end, and a tower with a pinnacle on each corner sits atop the roof near the front.

In 1975, the church was listed on the National Register of Historic Places, qualifying both because of its historically significant architecture and because of its general importance in local history. It is one of four National Register-listed locations in Windsor, along with the Wiswell Road Covered Bridge, the Windsor Mills Fort and Village Site (a prehistoric archaeological site), and the town center at Windsor Center.

The church is now operated seasonally as the Windsor Historical Society Museum.
