= National Construction Equipment Museum =

- Established: 1992
- Location: Bowling Green, Ohio
- Coordinates: 41°23′44″N 83°42′41″W
- Type: Construction Equipment
- Collection size: Over 170 construction equipment machines
- President: Bill Annechini
- Chairperson: Mike Androvich
- Historian: Thomas Berry
- Website: www.hcea.net

The National Construction Equipment Museum is a non-profit organization located in Bowling Green, Ohio, United States that is dedicated to preserving the history of construction, dredging and surface mining industries and equipment. The museum is operated by the Historical Construction Equipment Association and features many different types of construction equipment, including cranes, shovels, rollers, scrapers, bulldozers, dump trucks, concrete mixers, drills and other heavy equipment.

At the end of December 2021 an effort began to expand the museum.
