= Old U.S. Post Office (Marion, Ohio) =

- Old US Post Office
- U.S. National Register of Historic Places
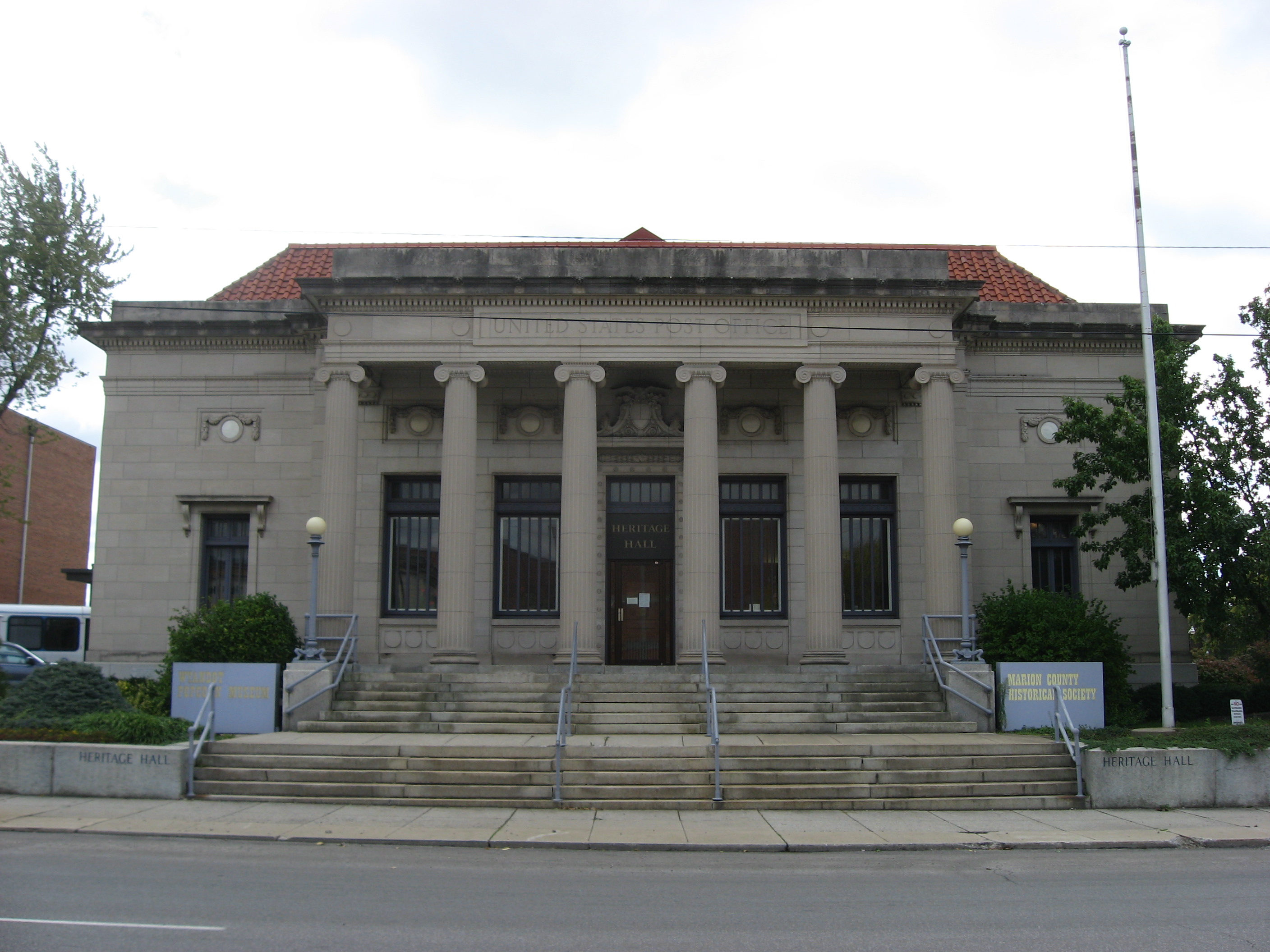
- Front of the post office

- Location within Ohio Location within the United States
- Interactive map of Old US Post Office
- Location: 169 E. Church St., Marion, Ohio
- Coordinates: 40°35′13″N 83°7′38″W
- Area: Less than 1 acre (0.40 ha)
- Built: 1910
- Architect: James Knox Taylor; John W. Uncafer
- Architectural style: Neoclassical
- NRHP reference No.: 90001777
- Added to NRHP: November 28, 1990

The Old U.S. Post Office in Marion, Ohio was built in 1910. It was listed on the National Register of Historic Places in 1990. It is currently used as the Heritage Hall museum by the Marion County Historical Society. The museum is dedicated to the preservation of Marion County Ohio history. Heritage Hall is also home of the Wyandot Popcorn Museum, the "only museum in the world dedicated to popcorn and its associated memorabilia."
