= Marion County Historical Society =

Museum in Marion, Ohio

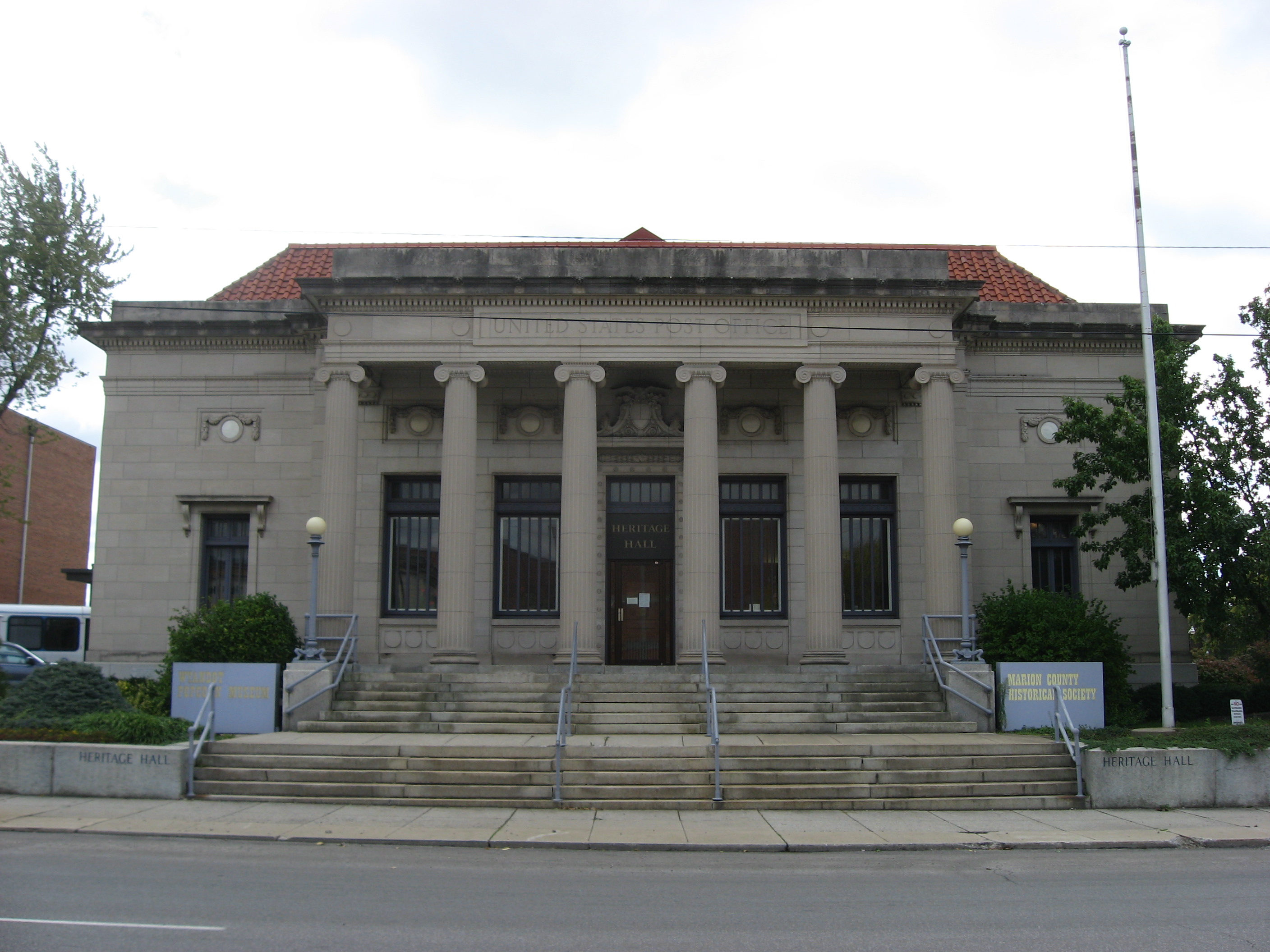
- Heritage Hall, formerly the old post office.
- Established: 1969
- Location: 169 E. Church Street, Marion, Ohio 43302
- Coordinates: 40°35′13″N 83°7′38″W
- Type: Local history
- Executive director: Brandi Wilson
- Website: marionhistory.com

The Marion County Historical Society is a non-profit organization founded in 1969 located in Marion, Ohio, United States. In 1989, the Society acquired Marion's "U.S. Post Office," renaming it "Heritage Hall". This National Register building now serves as the Society's headquarters and museum that houses a collection of artifacts, photographs, and documents related to the county's history.

Additionally the Society operates the Rinker-Howser Resource Center, Linn School House and Seiter Cabin sites. Heritage Hall is also the home of the Wyandot Popcorn Museum, the "only museum in the world dedicated to popcorn and its associated memorabilia."

== Programming ==
Docent-led tours explore permanent exhibits at Heritage Hall, like the Harding Collection and the Meseke Collection. The Linn School offers a simulated school day experience, and the Seiter Cabin tour explores the history of early Marion County settlers.

Educational programs include school programs tailored to specific grade levels and genealogy workshops to help individuals trace their family history in Marion County. The Society also hosts lectures by historians and experts, organizes special events like living history demonstrations, and offers children's programs like history scavenger hunts and hands-on crafts.

== Exhibits ==
Permanent displays at the museum include

- Harding Collection on President Warren G. Harding and Florence Kling Harding.
- Marilyn Meseke Collection – Miss America, 1938.
- Prince Imperial, one of the first Percheron horses imported to North America and purchased from Napoleon III by Marion County horse breeder Jacob Houser.
- Mary Ellen Withrow Collection – Treasurer of the United States of America 1994-2000 and the only person to hold the office who represented all three levels of government treasurer offices – local, state and national.

== Wyandot Popcorn Museum ==
The Wyandot Popcorn Museum is part of the Marion County Historical Society's Heritage Hall in Marion, Ohio. Established in 1982, it claims to be the largest collection of restored popcorn wagons and peanut roasters in the United States. The museum showcases a colorful circus tent display featuring antique popcorn wagons dating back to the early 20th century. These restored wagons represent various classic popper brands like Cretors, Dunbar, and Kingery. The Wyandot Popcorn Museum is one of only two popcorn museums in the world, the other being the J.H. Fentress Antique Popcorn Museum in Holland, Ohio.

== Linn School ==
The Linn School is a fully restored one-room schoolhouse operated by the Marion County Historical Society in Marion, Ohio. Built in 1897, the school served students in grades one through eight in rural Marion County for over 45 years. It closed its doors in 1942.

The schoolhouse is restored to its early 20th-century appearance and features period desks, textbooks, and educational supplies. Visitors can experience a simulated school day and learn about 19th-century education methods. Linn School has been recognized by the National Trust for Historic Preservation as one of the outstanding examples of preservation for 2004.

== See also ==
- List of historical societies in Ohio
