= A. H. Heisey =

American businessman

Augustus Henry Heisey
- Born: 1842; Hanover, Germany
- Died: February 13, 1922 (aged 79–80); Atlantic City, New Jersey, US
- Military career
- Allegiance: United States
- Branch: Infantry
- Service years: 1862–1865
- Rank: Brevet rank of major
- Unit: Company C of the 155th Regiment of Pennsylvania Zouaves
- Conflicts: American Civil War

Augustus Henry Heisey (1842 – February 13, 1922) was an American industrialist, soldier and glassmaker in Ohio. The Heisey Glass Company would continue operations until 1957.

== Biography ==
Heisey was born in Hanover, Germany, and emigrated with his family to the United States as an infant in 1843. The family settled in Merrittown, Pennsylvania, where Heisey graduated from the Merrittown Academy. Following his father's death and his mother's return to Germany, Augustus lived with his sister. Upon graduation, he entered the printing business for a short time. He made a career change in 1861, becoming a clerk with the King Glass Company in Pittsburgh.

However, the American Civil War interrupted his career, and he enlisted as a private in the Union Army in 1862. He served with Company C of the 155th Regiment of Pennsylvania Zouaves and fought in several battles, including the Battle of Gettysburg, where he was wounded during the defense of Little Round Top. He served in twenty-two different engagements and was cited for gallantry. In 1864, he was promoted to the rank of captain. He left the army the following year, having risen to the brevet rank of major.

Following the war, Heisey resumed his career in the glass industry, becoming first a shipping clerk and later a salesman for Ripley & Company of Pittsburgh. He was regarded as one of the best salesmen in the industry. On May 11, 1870, in Pittsburgh, he married Susan N. Duncan, daughter of George Duncan Sr., who soon became the sole owner of the Ripley Glass Company and renamed it Geo. Duncan & Sons. Heisey later became part owner and general manager of the Duncan Glass Company, along with his wife and brother-in-law.

In 1895, after several years away from the glass industry, Augustus Heisey moved to Newark, Ohio, and opened a glass factory there on the site of the old Penny Farm, commencing operations in 1896. During his time in Newark, Heisey rose to several other important positions in business and in the community. He was President of the Newark Trust Company, Vice President of the Ohio National Life Insurance Company, a founder and director of the Newark Heat and Light Company and a number of other important community business and social institutions.

Augustus died February 13, 1922, at Atlantic City, New Jersey, and his sons E. Wilson and T. Clarence assumed control of the company. They ran the factory successfully until it ceased production following the Christmas holiday in 1957.
