= Lindsey, Ohio =

- Village
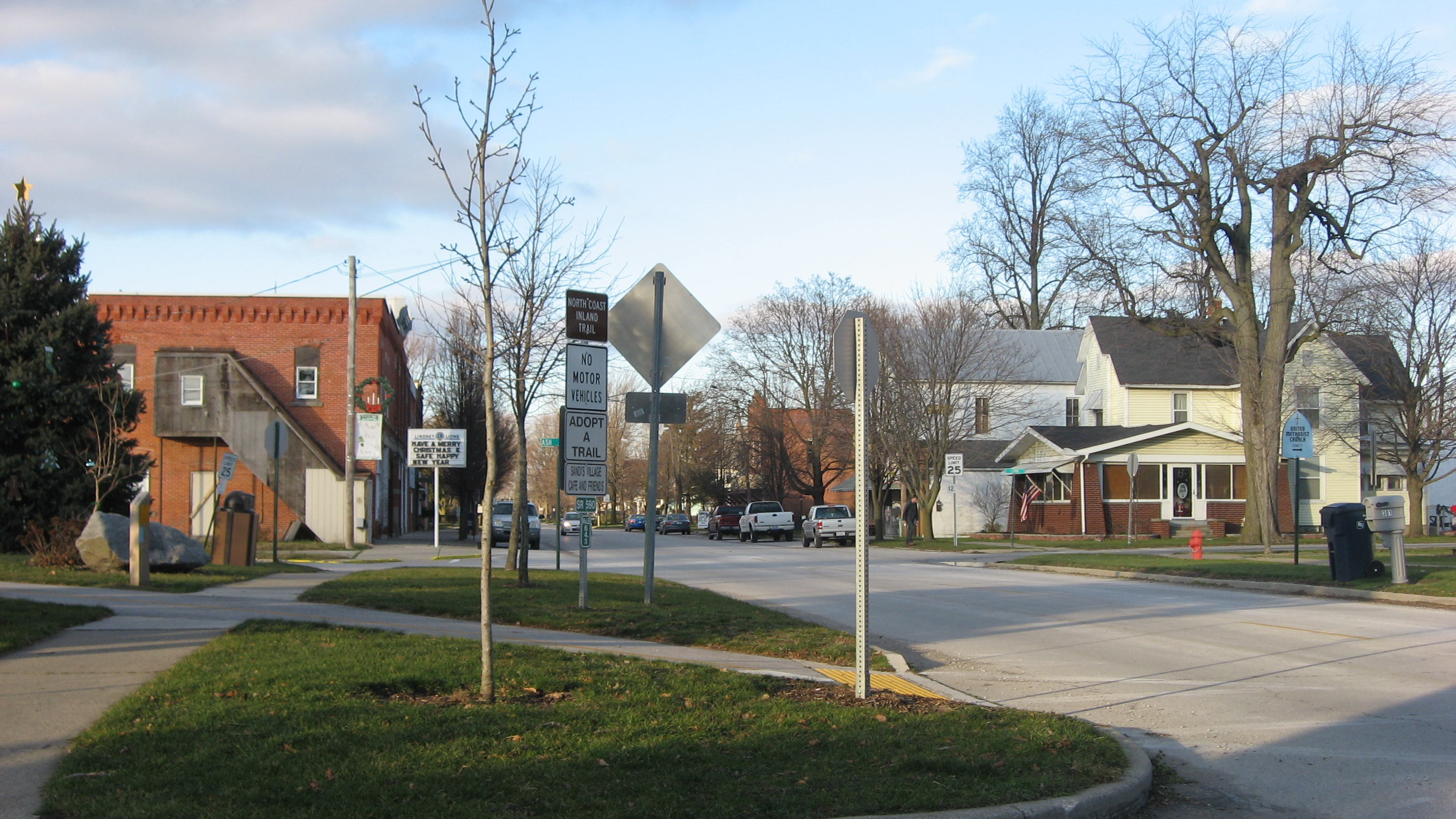
- Main Street in Lindsey

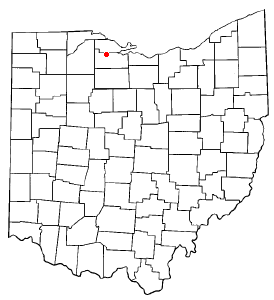
- Location of Lindsey, Ohio

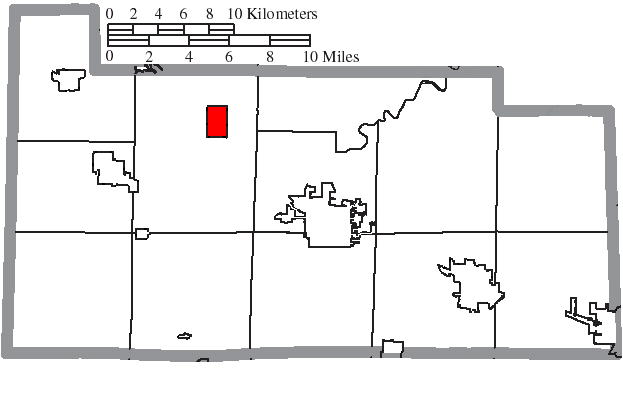
- Location of Lindsey in Sandusky County
- Coordinates: 41°25′18″N 83°13′16″W
- Country: United States
- State: Ohio
- County: Sandusky
- Township: Washington

Government
  - City Council Member: Steve Reineck

Area
  - Total: 1.56 sq mi (4.05 km^{2})
  - Land: 1.56 sq mi (4.05 km^{2})
  - Water: 0 sq mi (0.00 km^{2})
- Elevation: 617 ft (188 m)

Population (2020)
  - Total: 457
  - Density: 292.4/sq mi (112.89/km^{2})
- Time zone: UTC-5 (Eastern (EST))
  - Summer (DST): UTC-4 (EDT)
- ZIP code: 43442
- Area code: 419
- FIPS code: 39-43904
- GNIS feature ID: 2398446
- Website: https://www.villageoflindseyohio.com/

Lindsey is a village in Sandusky County, Ohio, United States, near the halfway point of the route between Detroit and Cleveland. The population was 457 at the 2020 census. The National Arbor Day Foundation has designated Lindsey as a Tree City USA.

== History ==
Lindsey was originally called Washington, and under the latter name was platted in 1853.

== Geography ==
According to the United States Census Bureau, the village has a total area of 1.56 square miles (4.04 km^{2}), all land.

Lindsey lies between combined interstate highways I-80 and I-90 and U.S. 20 on State Highway 590.

== Demographics ==
Historical population
Census	Pop.	Note	%±
1880	409		—
1890	458		12.0%
1900	614		34.1%
1910	501		−18.4%
1920	456		−9.0%
1930	446		−2.2%
1940	451		1.1%
1950	512		13.5%
1960	581		13.5%
1970	652		12.2%
1980	571		−12.4%
1990	529		−7.4%
2000	504		−4.7%
2010	446		−11.5%
2020	457		2.5%
U.S. Decennial Census

=== 2010 census ===
As of the census of 2010, there were 446 people, 187 households, and 139 families living in the village. The population density was 285.9 inhabitants per square mile (110.4/km^{2}). There were 209 housing units at an average density of 134.0 per square mile (51.7/km^{2}). The racial makeup of the village was 94.2% White, 0.4% African American, 0.4% Asian, 2.0% from other races, and 2.9% from two or more races. Hispanic or Latino of any race were 11.4% of the population.

There were 187 households, of which 29.9% had children under the age of 18 living with them, 62.0% were married couples living together, 8.6% had a female householder with no husband present, 3.7% had a male householder with no wife present, and 25.7% were non-families. 21.9% of all households were made up of individuals, and 10.2% had someone living alone who was 65 years of age or older. The average household size was 2.39 and the average family size was 2.79.

The median age in the village was 41 years. 23.8% of residents were under the age of 18; 5.6% were between the ages of 18 and 24; 26.9% were from 25 to 44; 28.5% were from 45 to 64; and 15.2% were 65 years of age or older. The gender makeup of the village was 48.0% male and 52.0% female.

=== 2000 census ===
As of the census of 2000, there were 504 people, 199 households, and 148 families living in the village. The population density was 327.0 inhabitants per square mile (126.3/km^{2}). There were 209 housing units at an average density of 135.6 per square mile (52.4/km^{2}). The racial makeup of the village was 93.65% White, 0.20% African American, 0.20% Native American, 0.20% Asian, 4.96% from other races, and 0.79% from two or more races. Hispanic or Latino of any race were 7.94% of the population.

There were 199 households, out of which 34.2% had children under the age of 18 living with them, 63.8% were married couples living together, 6.5% had a female householder with no husband present, and 25.6% were non-families. 23.6% of all households were made up of individuals, and 14.1% had someone living alone who was 65 years of age or older. The average household size was 2.53 and the average family size was 3.01.

In the village, the population was spread out, with 25.2% under the age of 18, 6.9% from 18 to 24, 29.6% from 25 to 44, 24.2% from 45 to 64, and 14.1% who were 65 years of age or older. The median age was 38 years. For every 100 females there were 100.0 males. For every 100 females age 18 and over, there were 92.3 males.

The median income for a household in the village was $45,781, and the median income for a family was $53,889. Males had a median income of $33,125 versus $25,208 for females. The per capita income for the village was $21,737. About 5.3% of families and 5.7% of the population were below the poverty line, including 5.4% of those under age 18 and 11.5% of those age 65 or over.
