= Heisey Glass Company =

Defunct American glassware company

A.H. Heisey and Company
- Type: Private company
- Industry: Glassware
- Founded: Newark, Ohio (1895)
- Defunct: 1957
- Headquarters: Newark, Ohio, United States
- Key people: A.H. Heisey
- Number of employees: 700

The A.H. Heisey Company was formed in Newark, Ohio, in 1895 by A.H. Heisey. The factory provided fine quality glass tableware and decorative glass figurines. Both pressed and blown glassware were made in a wide variety of patterns and colors. The company also made glass automobile headlights and Holophane Glassware lighting fixtures. The company was operated by Heisey and his sons until 1957, when the factory closed.

Heisey glassware is readily identifiable by its high clarity and brilliance. It is highly finished through the process of firepolishing, with polished bottoms. Many of the pressed pieces appear to be cut glass on casual inspection, due to the high quality of the glass and the crispness of the molding. The majority of the pieces are impressed with the company logo, a raised capital letter "H" inscribed in a diamond of approximately 1/4 inch (6.4 mm) in length. This mark is found on the bottom of most large pieces and on the base or stem of drinking glasses and compotes.

Heisey glass is highly collectible and widely available in antique stores across North America and online auctions such as eBay. Popular pattern names include Crystolite, Greek Key, Empress, Plantation, Ridgeleigh, Stanhope, Old Sandwich, and Yeoman, amongst dozens of others.

Heisey glass was produced in colors throughout the life of the factory, but the most prolific period of color manufacturing was from 1925 to 1938, when the most collectible colors were created. The company went to great lengths to produce distinct colors, and Heisey glass may often be identified from the specific colors alone. In 1925, Flamingo (a pastel rose-pink) and Moongleam (a vivid green) were introduced and produced in large quantities. Marigold is a brassy gold-yellow color. Sahara, which replaced Marigold, is a satisfying soft lemony yellow color. Hawthorne is a lavender color. Tangerine, a bright orange-red produced from about 1933, was part of a trend to darker, more vivid colors. During this time, a Cobalt color called Stiegel Blue was also produced. Alexandrite is the rarest of Heisey colors; it can be a pale blue-green under normal light, but in sunlight or ultraviolet light, it glows with a pink-lavender hue. Zircon is a very modern grey-blue and was the last new color introduced.

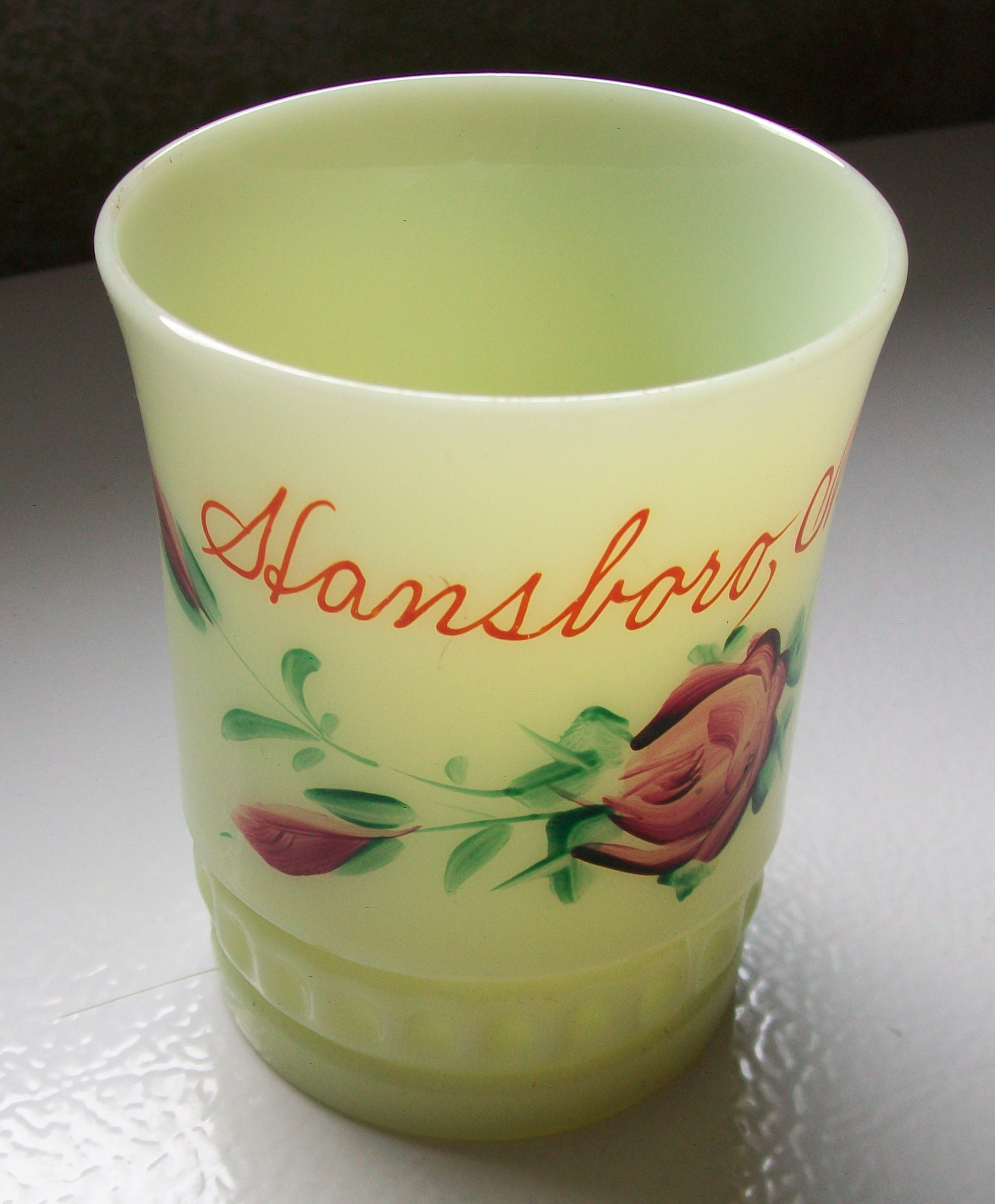
Heisey "Ivorina Verde" (greenish uranium milk glass) souvenir cup from Hansboro, likely from the decade prior to World War I.

Heisey is believed to have made a few pieces in milk glass in its early production years and likely produced vaseline glass as well in the early 1920s, although not in large quantities.

At the time the factory closed, the Imperial Glass Company bought the molds for the Heisey glass production and continued producing some pieces mostly with the Imperial Glass mark until they went out of business in 1984. Many of these pieces were animal figurines, mostly in new or original colors using the old molds.

== National Heisey Glass Museum ==
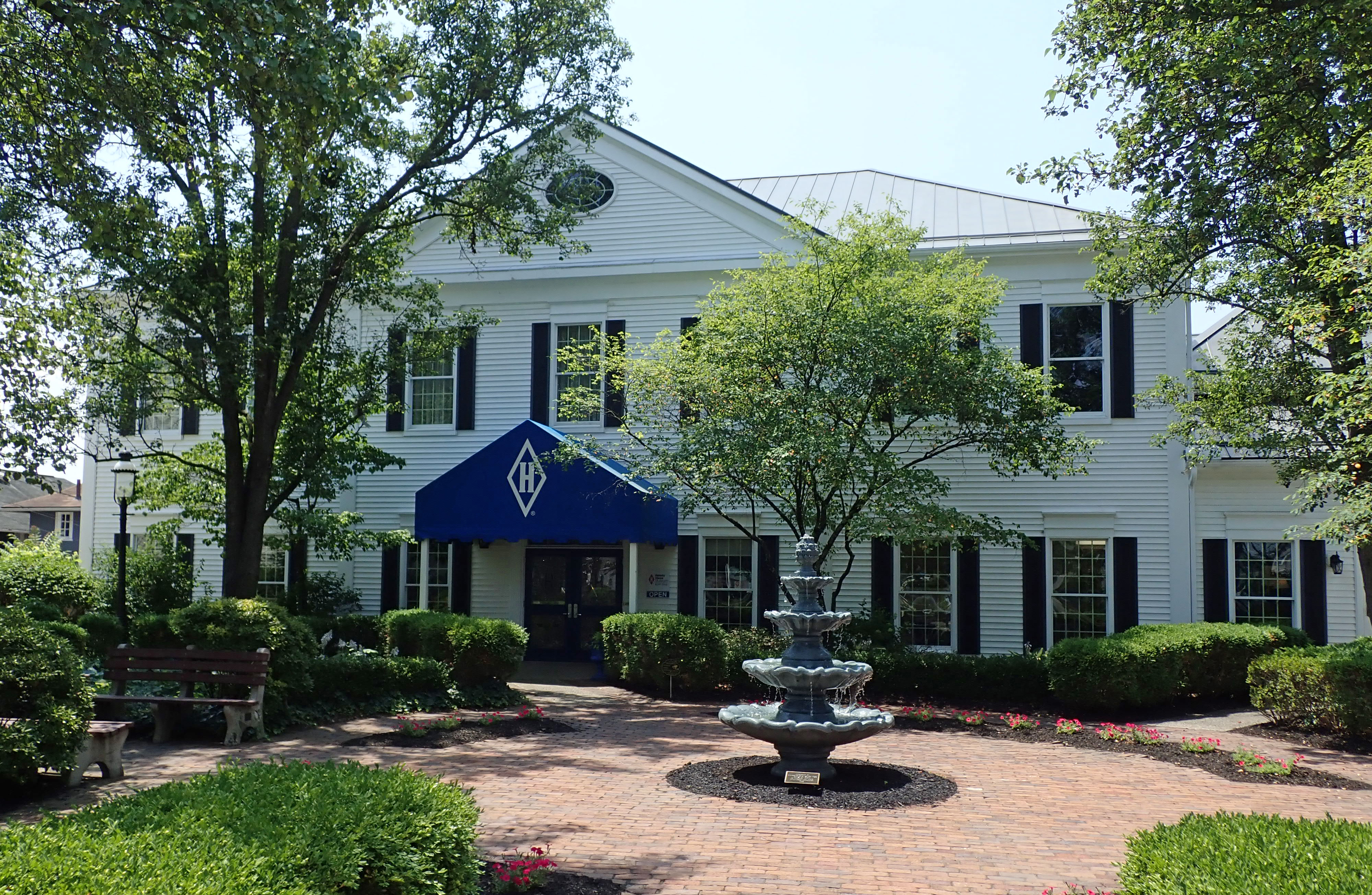
Heisey Glass Museum in Newark, OH

Enthusiasts of Heisey Glass formed the Heisey Collectors of America in 1971. In 1974, the group founded the National Heisey Glass Museum, located in Veterans Park in downtown Newark, Ohio. The museum is housed in the 1831 Samuel D. King home, which features a Greek Revival style. The museum maintains a significant collection of Heisey glass. Exhibits display examples of hundreds of patterns and all known colors, as well as such workmanship as cuttings, etchings, engravings, and experimental pieces. Other displays show the company's glass manufacturing process through molds, tools, etching plates, factory designs, and samples. In addition to the exhibits, the museum features a media center, company archives (with many original molds), a library, and a gift shop.

When the Imperial Glass Company went out of business in the 1980s, the club purchased the Heisey molds and established an archive. The Heisey Collectors of America occasionally reproduces pieces from the original molds, for fundraising purposes, that are sold in the gift shop.
