= John Lefelhocz =

American conceptual artist (born 1967)

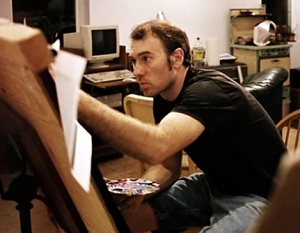
- John Lefelhocz in Open Studio - 2002
- Born: John William Lefelhocz; March 28, 1967 (age 59); Pittsburgh, Pennsylvania, United States
- Education: Ohio University
- Known for: Conceptual art, Quilter

John Lefelhocz ("lěf-ä-hōlts"; born 1967 in Pittsburgh, Pennsylvania) is an American conceptual artist primarily known for his works in the textile arts, specifically art quilts. He attended Ohio University (in Athens, Ohio). Since college, he has owned and operated Cycle Path Bicycle Shop in Athens, at the same time establishing himself as an artist. His art gained higher recognition in the late 1990s. This can be attributed to inclusion in several Quilt Nationals. He has subsequently shown his works throughout the US and abroad.

== Early work ==
After his education at Ohio University, Lefelhocz experimented in several media including digital illustrations (tessellations), wood assemblages, and found object sculpture. His experimentation with found object sculpture built a foundation for future works that have more emphasis on the conceptual, creating a greater depth of meaning.

== Layered Fabric Constructions - Quilts ==
In the late 1990s Lefelhocz steered toward a style with greater priority on the broader use of multimedia art. This style includes, but is not limited to, the use of digital paper prints, painting, needle work, and a refined use of found objects, frequently assembled in bas relief. These objects create a narrative through the use of metaphor and abstraction.

Many of the constructions possess the basic structural characteristics of a quilt. These are made of two distinct layers of predominantly fabric or fabric-like materials that are held together by pierced elements that are distributed throughout the surface of the work. "I have chosen to make artworks that are a construction of layers on several different levels so that viewers can digest my work in much the same way that they would enjoy a well put together sandwich. But the strength of my work goes beyond stitching together layers of fabric. I like to use everyday objects from which I can create layers that are seen from different distances. The layers are seen - or not seen - depending on the distance that the viewer stand from the work." Although Lefelhocz's works are not the classic quilted bed cover, his nonfunctional art quilts retain a symbiotic relationship with classic quilt design.

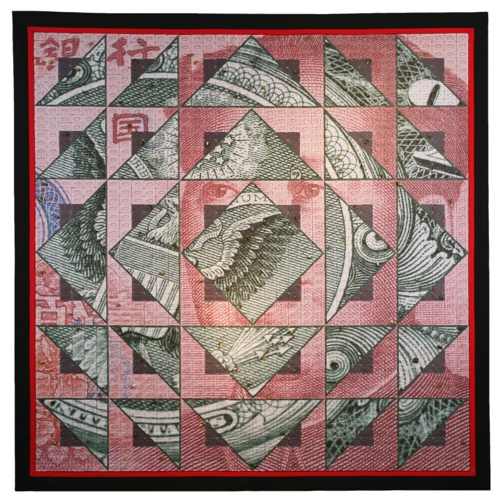
Fly Paper 89" x 89" (2015)

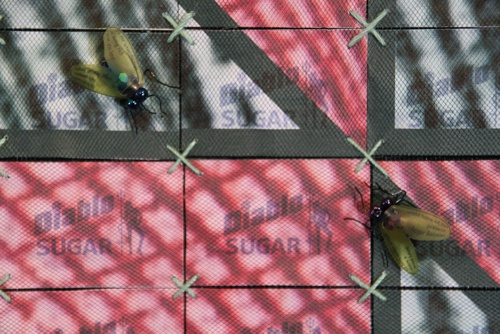
Fly Paper detail (2015)

Lefelhocz's quilted work debuted in Quilt National '99.

“I was naive and didn’t realize when I entered Quilt National how large the art quilt world was or how much respect there is for the Quilt National brand,” he recalled. “I just thought it was another art show with regional jurors, but the people who select the works for QN are chosen from far-reaching geographic localities and artistic backgrounds to ensure that new and cutting-edge approaches to the quilt making are discovered and recognized. Each time I’ve been accepted in Quilt National, it has opened up my art to a much larger audience and has given me greater confidence to explore more innovative ideas in future artworks.”

Lefelhocz says of his early quilts, "I was hand stitching with dental floss through window screening. There's an Appalachian culture here in Southeastern Ohio, where you ...make what you've got work". In Ohio Star Bar, a work to commemorate Ohio's bicentennial (2003), Lefelhocz brilliantly references both traditional quilts and landscape with imagery created in part on the computer. He says, "From a distance it looks like a traditional quilt, and I really enjoy that homage to my culture...I like including that lineage because it has meaning now, and it is going to have meaning further down the road."

== Concepts and social commentary ==
The materials chosen for each of Lefelhocz's work in this style further add to the overall concept. Based on a traditional Double Wedding Ring quilt pattern is the piece titled "Match Schticks" (73" x 62";2002).Instead of cloth, though the top is pieced from printed paper bonded to nylon net. The paper shows repeated images of wedding cakes, corsets, and dollar bills tied in the shape of bow ties. The surface of the work has extensive embellishment, including over three thousand kitchen matches. Lefelhocz points out,"I was aiming to point out the parallels between passion, fire, love, power, and combustibility by using the matches...The wedding cake is the symbol of sweetness and consumption. The corsets are dual symbols of feminine power and constriction. You have to be attractive for the attention, but you may suffer for it. The money bow ties are a masculine counterpart to the corset. You may have to have money to get the attention, but it might choke you"

These works also place more emphasis on social commentary through the interrelational imaginative use of found objects. Matthew Mangold writes, "The notion of "fiber" often includes not only materials commonly employed in the development of quilts, tapestries, and other such coverings, but unorthodox substances that heighten the conceptual basis in the work. Sheet metal, window screening, sugar packets, and trinkets of consumer culture are his chosen substance deployed against the detritus of Pop Art. Lefelhocz's compositions are not the ironically banal semiotics of Andy Warhol or James Rosenquist. Although not as sly as his predecessors, Lefelhocz's attacks are blatant, devastating and often two pronged. One only need to look at works like Match Schticks, where the institutions of marriage and the quilting tradition light up equally under his brand of RADAR.".

== Athens County Quilt Barns ==
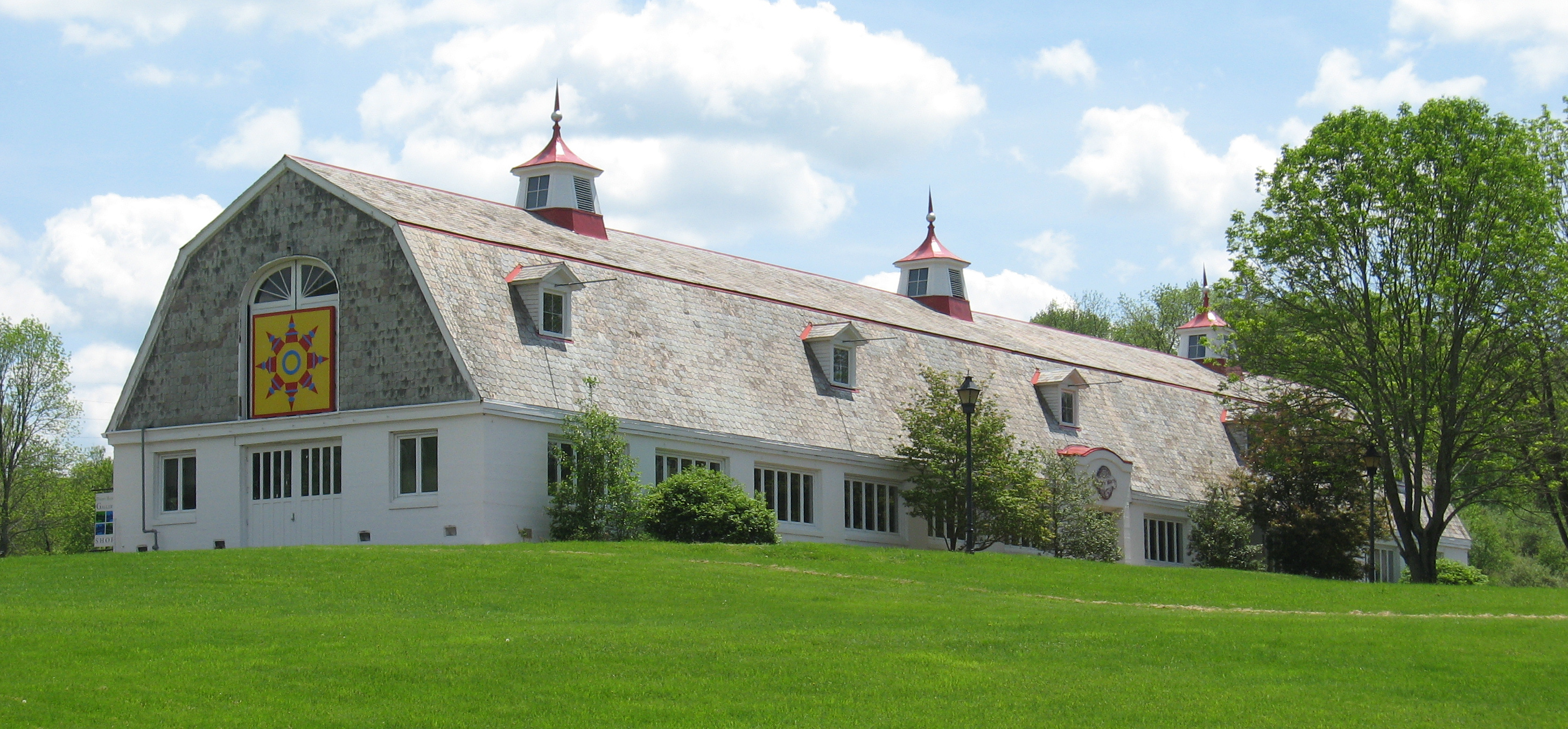
One of John Lefelhocz's quilt squares on the Athens State Hospital Cow Barn, now the Dairy Barn Arts Center in Athens, Ohio. It is located on the Patchwork Path through Athens County, Ohio

John Lefelhocz has also drawn from his knowledge of Athens County roads through cycling, his work with traditional quilt patterns, and his design skills to contribute to the Quilt Barn Tour: A Patchwork Path Through Athens County. This project took shape in 2005. "The project began as a part of a Regional Flavor Initiative, whose aims paralleled those that Donna Sue Groves of Adams County, Ohio had set forth as the goals for the barn quilt project ...by creating opportunities for tourism and entrepreneurship that emphasize each region's historic and cultural assets."

When the Athens County quilt barn committee first met, they intended to create a quilt barn trail using traditional quilt blocks. However, when, at their second meeting, artist and quilter Lefelhocz presented his idea for a quilt block based on the design of Star Brick, clay brick manufactured in nearby Nelsonville, Ohio during the late 1800s, the committee knew they were on to something. As Lefelhocz explained, it snowballed: “Then it was like ‘If we do that, we should do several others that represent Athens.’ We went through all the various things Athens County could represent . . . I brought sketches of those to the next meeting. And Sally Dunker, of the travel and tourism office, was like, ‘Wow, this is great.’” Even the traditional quilt blocks chosen for the Athens County quilt barn trail were carefully selected and adapted to highlight the culture of the county". Lefelhocz designed several original patterns used in conjunction with traditional blocks to represent Athens County, Ohio.

Lefelhocz one-of-a-kind modern patterns reference several other Athens County interests such as a local love affair with the Paw paw, the former Athens Lunatic Asylum, and the Dairy Barn Arts Center. Lefelhocz incorporated the Dairy Barn's unusual cupolas into the star pattern hung on the end of the barn facing the road.

The Ohio Arts Council Quilt Barn Impact Study published in 2008 highlights that beyond the purely artistic importance of quilt barns, they have great value for the Appalachian Ohio region in terms of the economic, social, and cultural strengthening of the region.

Lefelhocz was active in providing support for The Athens County Quilt Barn Bicycle Ride that occurred for several years each July.

== Juxtapassion ==
Lefelhocz originated the word, Juxtapassion.

Juxtapassion as explained by Lefelhocz is as follows;

"A spark is all it takes to unleash energy and passion. Art can be that spark. In my art, I like to place carefully chosen ideas and concepts side by side to set the viewer's mind and emotions ablaze." The word "Juxtapassion” is a combination of “juxta,” meaning adjacent or close to, and “passion,” the resulting strong emotions, excitement or zeal. Many of Lefelhocz's artistic endeavors employ this tenet.
