= The Wind is Watching =

- Directed by: Conrad Faraj
- Screenplay by: Candyce Cook
- Produced by: Conrad Faraj; Meg Quisenberry; Jason Ross
- Starring: Nicole Ann Hicks; Rick Montgomery Jr. Logan Roberts
- Cinematography: Greg Kraus
- Edited by: Conrad Faraj
- Production company: Conrad Studios; Sector 8 Films
- Release date: 2014
- Running time: 94 minutes
- Country: United States
- Language: English
- Budget: Estimated $100,000

The Wind is Watching is an American dystopian film directed by Conrad Faraj and written by Candyce Cook. Production began in mid-2012, with filming taking place in 28 locations across Northeast Ohio.

== Premise ==
In a rural dystopia, a nuclear contamination in the Pacific Ocean has provoked a second civil war. A young farm girl named Cara Gardner (Nicole Ann Hicks) must embark on a journey through war-torn America to rescue her only remaining family.

== Cast ==
- Nicole Ann Hicks as Cara Gardner
- Rick Montgomery Jr. as General Joseph Kellerman
- Logan Roberts as Jamie Gardner
- Aleksandar Zivkovic as Finn
- Nicole Karis as Afton
- Douglas Slygh as Barry Kellerman
- Mary Faktor as Rose
- Jonathan Yurco as Calvin
- Brianna Burke as Nadia
- Bailey Weaver as Ashley
- John Williamson as Quentin

== Production ==
According to the film's director, 70% of the film was shot in Shelby, Ohio and Mansfield, Ohio, with some scenes having been shot at the Ohio State Reformatory.
