= City Club of Cleveland =

Debate forum in Cleveland, Ohio, US

The City Club of Cleveland
- Formation: October 28, 1912; 114 years ago
- Founders: Mayo Fesler and Augustus Hatton
- Type: Nonprofit
- Purpose: Non-partisan debate forum
- Headquarters: 1317 Euclid Avenue, Suite 100 Cleveland, OH 44115
- Region served: Cleveland, Ohio, US
- Chief Executive Officer: Dan Moulthrop
- Website: CityClub.org

The City Club of Cleveland is a non-partisan debate forum in Cleveland, Ohio. Founded in 1912, and known as "America's Citadel of Free Speech", it is one of the oldest continuous independent free speech forums in the United States.

The City Club's home is in the Playhouse Square District, located at 1317 Euclid Avenue. The building was formerly a F.W. Woolworth department store, and was most recently occupied by Dwellworks. The City Club moved to their current location in September 2023, after four decades at the City Club Building, formerly the Citizens Building, on Euclid Avenue in Downtown Cleveland.

The mission of the City Club is to "create conversations of consequence that help democracy thrive". Membership is open to anyone and all programs are open to the general public, although members are charged lower prices to attend most forums and given preference in making reservations to certain programs.

== History ==
The City Club was conceived at a luncheon in June 1912 organized by Mayo Fesler, secretary of the Cleveland Municipal Association, in the ideals of the Progressive Era. Future Cleveland city manager Daniel E. Morgan was its first president. Since its founding, it has hosted sitting U.S. Presidents and vice-presidents and other notable citizens of the United States and the world. Archbishop Desmond Tutu called the club "a beacon, a symbol and a sentinel for freedom, for justice, for tolerance" when he spoke there.

The first president to have appeared at the City Club was Theodore Roosevelt; many modern Presidents have appeared at its podium, beginning with Jimmy Carter. President George W. Bush spoke to the club on the third anniversary of the United States' invasion of Iraq. Because the City Club of Cleveland does not allow questions from the audience to be pre-screened, President Ronald Reagan declined to appear before the club, but when questions were raised by the media about his mental acuity, Reagan sought out an appearance before the club to refute those charges.

The day after Martin Luther King Jr. was assassinated in 1968, Senator Robert F. Kennedy gave his On the Mindless Menace of Violence speech at the club.

In 1976, as part of the United States Bicentennial, the club held a forum in Britain, the club's first outside the United States.

Debates before the Club have swayed Ohio elections. Before John Glenn defeated Howard Metzenbaum in the 1974 Democratic Senate primary, Glenn responded to a charge in an earlier debate that he never had to make a payroll:

I served 23 years in the United States Marine Corps. I served through two wars. I flew 149 missions. My plane was hit by antiaircraft fire on 12 different occasions. I was in the space program. It wasn't my checkbook; it was my life on the line. It was not a nine-to-five job where I took time off to take the daily cash receipts to the bank. I ask you to go with me ... as I went the other day to a veterans hospital and look at those men with their mangled bodies in the eye and tell them they didn't hold a job. You go with me to the space program and go as I have gone to the widows and orphans of Ed White, Gus Grissom, and Roger Chaffee, and you look those kids in the eye and tell them that their dad didn't hold a job. You go with me on Memorial Day, coming up, and you stand in Arlington National Cemetery, where I have more friends than I'd like to remember, and you watch those waving flags. You stand there, and you think about this nation, and you tell me that those people didn't have a job, I'll tell you, Howard Metzenbaum, you should be on your knees every day of your life thanking God that there were some men — SOME MEN — who held a job. And they required a dedication to purpose, a love of country and a dedication to duty that was more important than life itself. And their self-sacrifice is what made this country possible ... I HAVE HELD A JOB, HOWARD! What about you?

During the 2010 Congressional elections, in which the Republicans regained control of the House of Representatives, John Boehner on August 24, 2010, announced a five-point plan at the club that he said would provide an effective economic alternative to the Democrats' course.

Sometimes politicians decline to appear at forums because it would provide exposure to their opponents in a political race. Congressman Dennis Kucinich, who complained vociferously about being excluded from debates among the Democratic candidates for president, has several times refused to debate his opponent for Congress in The City Club of Cleveland debates.

The club has been criticized for bestowing its "Citadel of Free Speech" award upon Justice Antonin Scalia, who then refused to allow his speech to be broadcast. The Board of Trustees of the City Club defended its actions by noting that the press was welcome to attend the special presentation and report upon the event. Other recipients of the Citadel of Free Speech award include John Glenn, Martin Luther King's aide and U.N. Ambassador Andrew Young, and CNN founder Ted Turner.

== Creed of the City Club ==
In 1916, Ralph Hayes, then the Secretary of the City Club, penned its creed.

— I hail and harbor and hear persons of every belief and party; for within my portals prejudice grows less and bias dwindles.

— I have a forum – as wholly uncensored as it is rigidly impartial. "Freedom of Speech" is graven above my rostrum; and beside it, "Fairness of Speech."

— I am the product of the people, a cross section of their community—weak as they are weak, and strong in their strength; believing that knowledge of our failings and our powers begets a greater strength.

— I have a house of fellowship; under my roof informality reigns and strangers need no introduction.

— I welcome to my platform the discussion of any theory or dogma or reform; but I bind my household to the espousal of none of them, for I cherish the freedom of every person's conviction and each of my kin retains his own responsibility.

— I have no axe to grind, no logs to roll. My abode shall be the rendezvous of strong but open-minded men and my watchword shall be "information" not "reformation."

— I am accessible to people of all sides—literally and figuratively—for I am located in the heart of the city—spiritually and geographically.

— I am the city's club—The City Club.

== Friday Forum ==
The City Club's Friday Forum is broadcast live on the radio in more than 40 states from Maine to Alaska. The broadcast is initiated live on Ideastream Public Media's WKSU (relayed over a regional network including WCPN) with encore broadcasts on co-owned WCLV. Most stations, including the iHeartMedia station group in Cleveland, air the Friday Forum as part of their Sunday morning public service requirements.

Television broadcasts of the City Club's Friday Forum also occur over Ideastream's WVIZ and on The Ohio Channel, and are often also aired nationwide on C-SPAN as part of their regular coverage of civic and political discussions and forums throughout the United States.

== Notable guests ==
- Isabel Allende
- Sherrod Brown
- George W. Bush
- Jimmy Carter
- Bill Clinton
- Ta-Nehisi Coates
- Marian Wright Edelman
- Robert F. Kennedy
- John Kerry
- Peter B. Lewis
- Akil Marshall
- Reverend Otis Moss Jr.
- Ralph Nader
- Barack Obama
- Rosa Parks
- Ronald Reagan
- Theodore Roosevelt
- Louis Stokes
- Jim Thome
- Archbishop Desmond Tutu
- Janet Yellen
- Joe Biden
