= Citizens Savings and Trust Company =

Citizens Savings and Trust Company was a bank in Cleveland, Ohio founded as the Citizens Savings and Loan Association. J.H. Wade established the bank and served as its chair. Hubbell & Benes, a Cleveland architectural firm that did many projects for he and his family, built the Citizens Building for the bank in 1903. The bank was merged into Union Trust in December 1920 and Joseph Randolph Nutt became president.
