= Schofield Building =

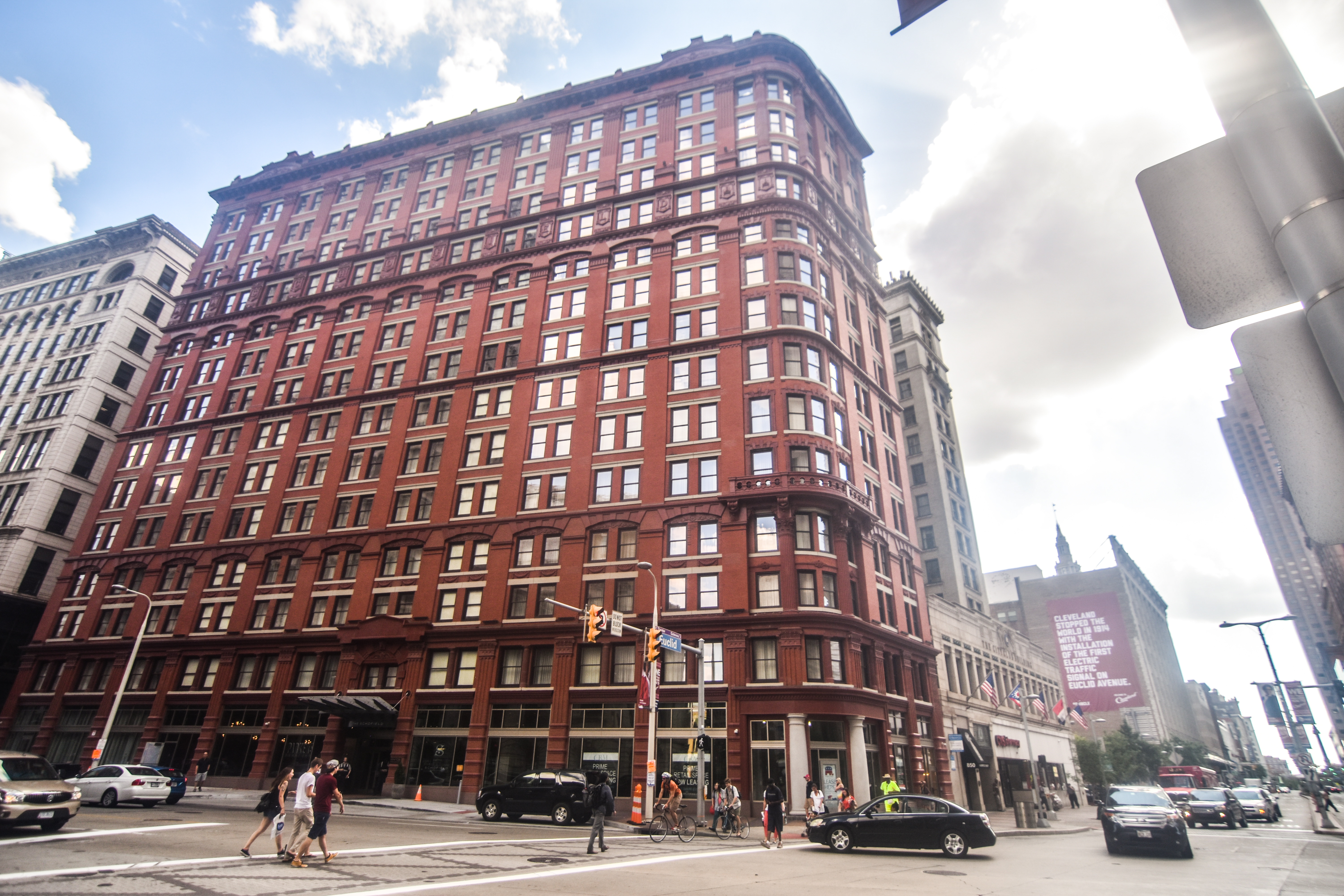
- Interactive map of the Schofield Building area
- Former names: TransOhio Tower; Euclid Ninth Tower

General information
- Type: Hotel, residential
- Location: 2000 East 9th Street Cleveland, Ohio 44115 United States
- Coordinates: 41°29′59.57″N 81°41′12.23″W
- Construction started: 1901
- Completed: 1902
- Renovated: 2016

Height
- Roof: 172 ft (52 m)

Technical details
- Floor count: 14

Design and construction
- Architect: Levi Scofield

The Schofield Building (previously known as the Euclid Ninth Tower) is a high-rise building in downtown Cleveland, Ohio. The 172-foot (52 m), 14-story building is located at the southwest corner of East 9th Street and Euclid Avenue, adjacent to the Rose Building and the City Club Building in the city's Historic Gateway District. Built in 1902 as an office building, the seven lower floors are now home to the Kimpton Schofield Hotel and the upper seven stories house apartments known as the Schofield Residences.

== History ==
Owned by the Calabrese family of Cleveland, the Schofield was constructed as an office building. The structure was the work of Cleveland architect Levi Scofield, who was also responsible for the Soldiers' and Sailors' Monument on Public Square.

=== 1969 refacing ===
About February 1968, a group of local investors that included attorney Eugene Selker, contractor Philip Nishin, and Broadway Wrecking Co. owner Gerald Garson purchased the Schofield Building from the Calabrese family. The new owners spent a year studying the structure to determine how it could be best be renovated.

In June 1969, the building was refaced to give it a modernist look. Refacing was preferred over an entirely new facade because it would disturb the tenants much less. The $2 million project (equivalent to $13,084,000 in 2024) was designed by local architects Jack Alan Bialosky and Marvin Manders. Except for six recessed lion heads on the fourth and fifth floors, all the terra cotta and sandstone belt courses, pilaster capitals, scroll work, festoons, and other decorative elements were chiseled off or removed.

The new facing consisted of cream-colored columns of Glasweld, an asbestos-reinforced cement-like material with a glazed enamel surface. The Nelson Facade Co. of Toledo, Ohio, mounted the facade using angled iron clips bolted deep into the existing brick. The clips held horizontal aluminum members to which the columns were attached. New aluminum sashes brought the windows forward so they were nearly flush with the new facade. The space between the new and recessed sash, about 15 inches (380 mm), was filled with drywall. The column between each pair of windows and the panl under them were made of bronze-colored Glasweld. It took two months to put the facade in place.

The building's 12-foot (3.7 m) high mansard roof was newly ribbed in bronzed aluminum. A slight overhang of bronzed aluminum was also added to divert water away from store signs on the first floor, and a marquee extended 9 feet (2.7 m) out over the sidewalk at the main entrance.

The building's interior was also renovated and updated. All 484 cast iron upright radiators were removed and replaced with a new heating and cooling system installed just inside and the windows. Hot water for heating was pumped up from the basement, while cold water for cooling was fed down from six water towers on the roof. Each office suite had its own individual heating and cooling controls. Throughout the building, ceilings were lowered, new lighting fixtures were installed, floors were retiled, and interior walls updated to a more modern look.

The building was renamed the Euclid Ninth Tower.

=== 2016 restoration ===
The Schofield underwent an extensive five-year restoration and renovation to convert the building to a hotel-residential building. The Modernist facing was removed and the original facade restored. The renovated building opened in March 2016.

Cleveland family owned real estate & architecture firm, CRM (Calabrese, Racek, & Markos) and Kimpton Hotels & Restaurants Group oversaw the $50 million project to restore the exterior of a Cleveland landmark to its original early-20th-century appearance. In this new configuration, the Schofield's first seven floors have 122 hotel rooms and six suites, with the upper seven floors housing 52 apartments of varying sizes.
