= Friedrich Ferdinand Schnitzer =

American architect

Friedrich Ferdinand Schnitzer (F.F. Schnitzer) (October 1840 - 11 November 1910) was an architect and builder who was the principal architect for many structures listed on the National Register of Historic Places, including the Ohio State Reformatory in Mansfield, Ohio.

== Biography ==
Schnitzer was born in Kempten, Allgäu, Bavaria, where his family owned an estate on 200 acres. He attended University of Berlin. In 1859, his family emigrated to the United States and he earned degree as an architect in Ohio. In January 1863, he married Louise Marie Bachman Schnitzer. He lived in Delaware, Ohio and then Mansfield, Ohio. His business became Schnitzer & Son when he was joined by one of his sons. His father and one of his sons were also named Friedrich Schnitzer. He had 9 children and he designed a house for each of them.

He bid on culvert construction projects in Plymouth Township.

== Notable buildings ==
- Delaware City Hall in Delaware, Ohio (1873)
- Richland County Infirmary in Mansfield, Ohio also known as Richland County Home (NRHP listed) Now known as Dayspring

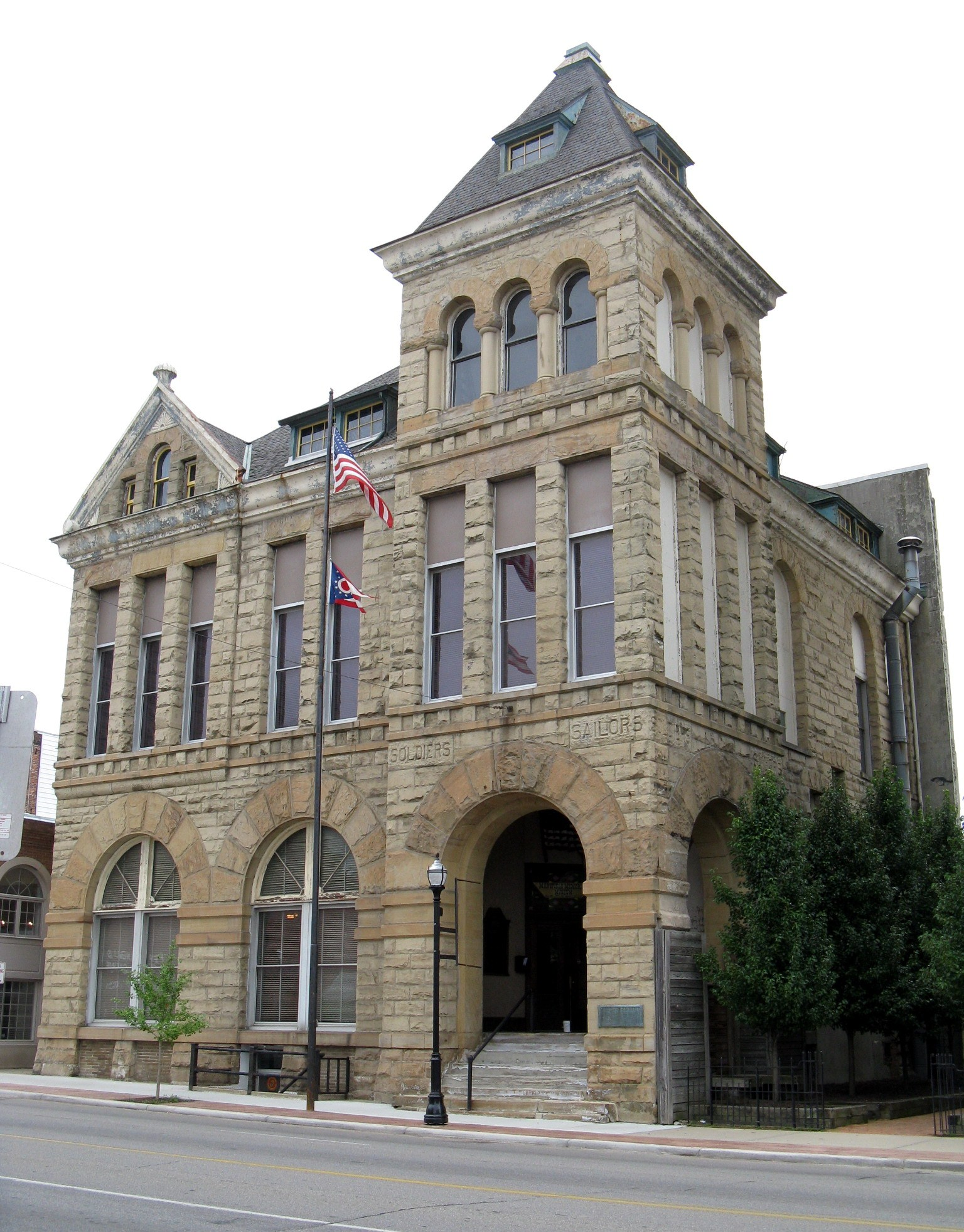
Soldiers and Sailors Memorial

- Soldiers and Sailors Memorial (1888) in Mansfield. NRHP listed. Now a museum.
- Soldiers' and Sailors' Monument (Cleveland), supervising architect
- Ohio State Reformatory (built 1886 - 1910), also known as the Mansfield Reformatory. Schnitzer was supervising architect, and his name was found in documents contained in the cornerstone confirming him as architect. Schnitzer developed original sketches designing the building to resemble the Bavarian castles he remembered from his youth in Kempten, Bavaria. Schnitzer was presented with a silver double inkwell from the governor of the state in a lavish ceremony to thank him for his services. The building was used in the film The Shawshank Redemption.
