= These Are My Jewels =

War monument in Columbus, Ohio, U.S.

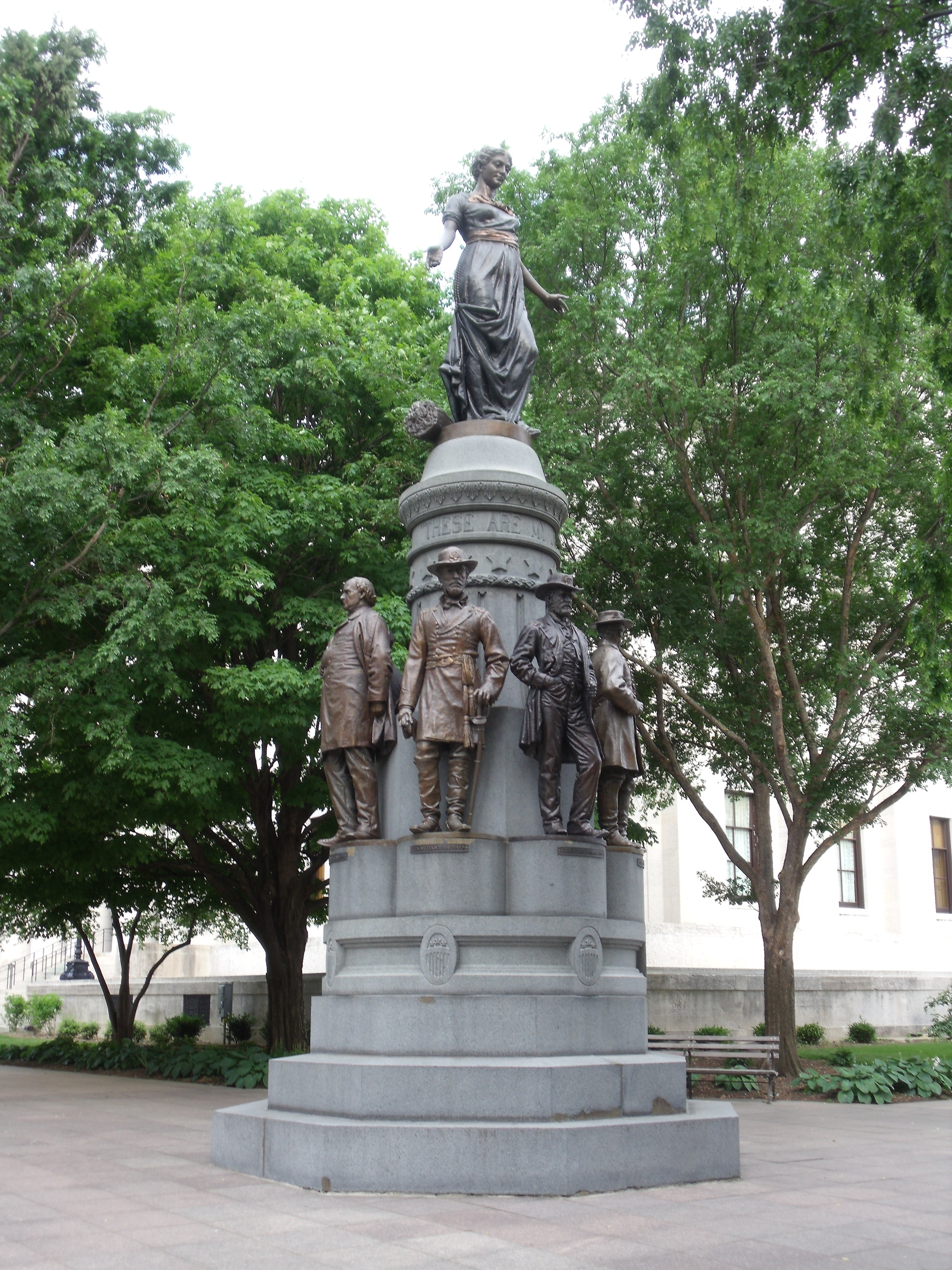
- The monument in 2009
- Artist: Levi Scofield
- Year: 1894
- Medium: Bronze sculpture
- Subject: Salmon P. Chase; Cornelia; James A. Garfield; Ulysses S. Grant; Rutherford B. Hayes; Philip Sheridan; William Tecumseh Sherman; Edwin Stanton
- Location: Columbus, Ohio, United States
- 39°57′42.5″N 82°59′59.0″W

These Are My Jewels (also known as Ohio's Jewels: Grant, Sheridan, Stanton, Garfield, Hayes, Chase, and Sherman, or simply Ohio's Jewels) is an 1893–1894 monument by Levi Scofield, installed outside the Ohio Statehouse in Columbus, Ohio, United States.

== Description ==
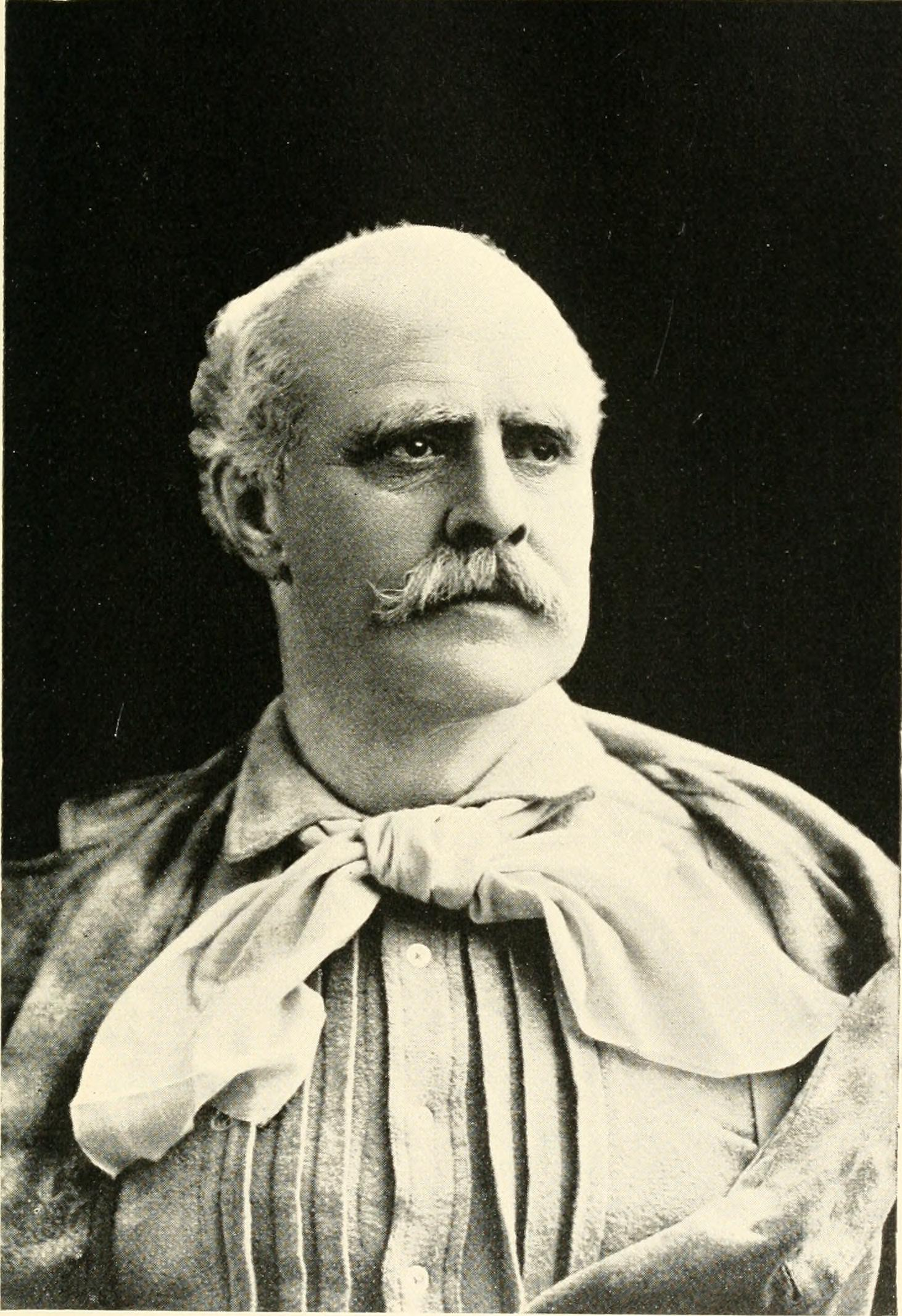
Levi Scofield, c. 1894

The monument features life-size bronze statues of seven men — Salmon P. Chase, James A. Garfield, Ulysses S. Grant, Rutherford B. Hayes, Philip Sheridan, William Tecumseh Sherman, and Edwin Stanton — as well as a bronze statue of the Roman Cornelia.

The sculptural group stands at the northwest corner of the statehouse grounds (Capitol Square). It honors military and political leaders from Ohio who significantly contributed to the Union during the American Civil War. The monument's name is from an ancient Roman anecdote about the wealthy Cornelia. When asked by her well-dressed friends where her jewelry was, Cornelia left and returned with her sons, saying "These are my jewels!". Cornelia personifies Ohio, presenting its best leaders during the time of crisis.

The monument was designed by Levi Scofield, known for his Soldiers' and Sailors' Monument on the Public Square in Cleveland.

== History ==
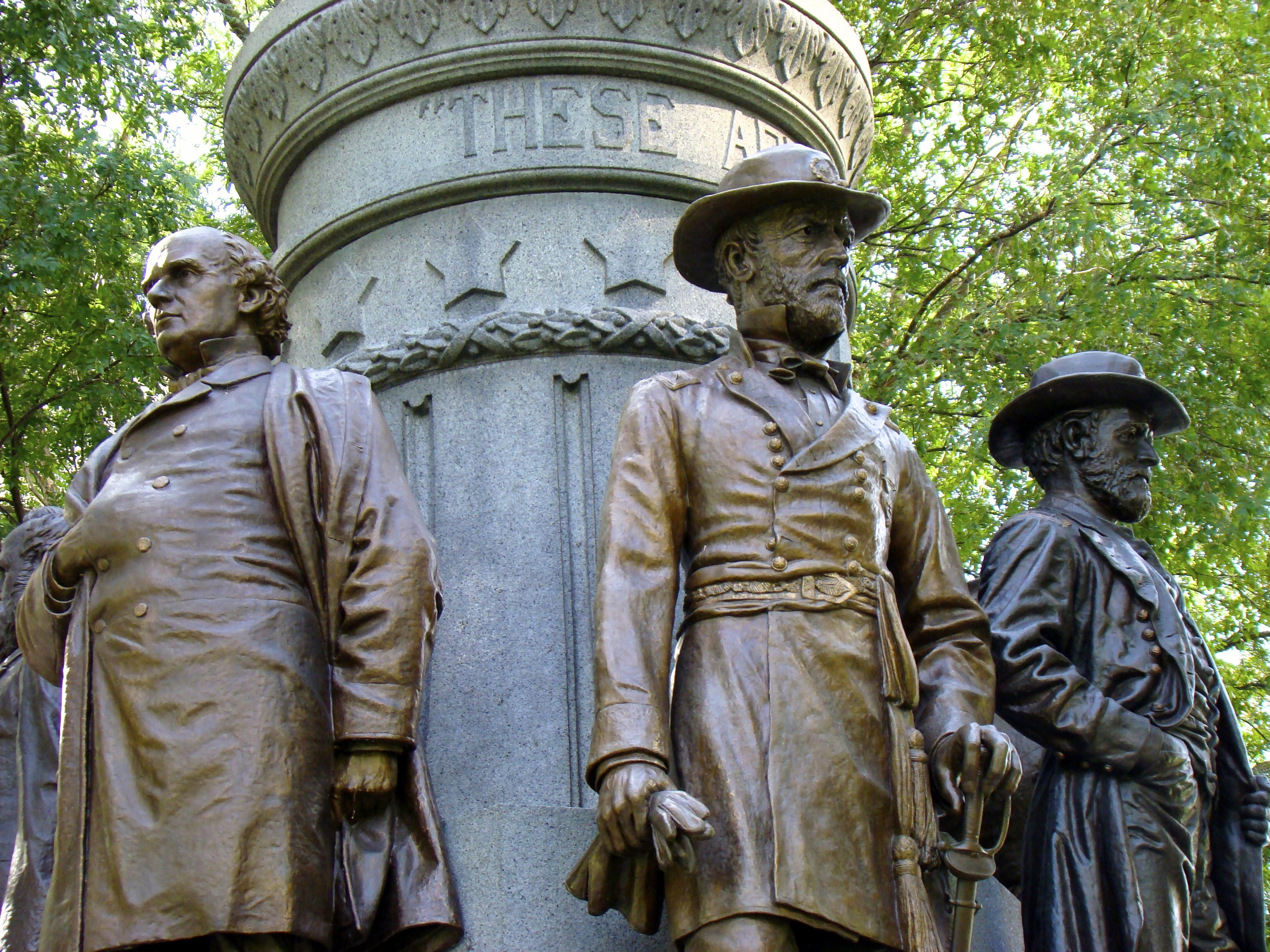
Detail of the sculptural group, 2013

The sculptural group was conceived by General Roeliff Brinkerhoff, one of the founders of the current-day Ohio History Connection. Brinkerhoff wanted a monument for the Ohio Pavilion in the World's Columbian Exposition, the 1893 Chicago world's fair. It was moved to Columbus at the fair's end. The statue originally displayed six Ohioans, though Ohio governor and later president William McKinley led efforts to add on a statue of Rutherford B. Hayes, his former commanding officer. The act led the monument to depict three of the eventual eight U.S. presidents from Ohio. The monument was dedicated in 1894, and rededicated on June 10, 1965 and November 5, 1992.

The artwork was surveyed by the Smithsonian Institution's "Save Outdoor Sculpture!" program in 1993.

== See also ==
- List of sculptures of presidents of the United States
