= Athens State Hospital Cow Barn =

- U.S. National Register of Historic Places
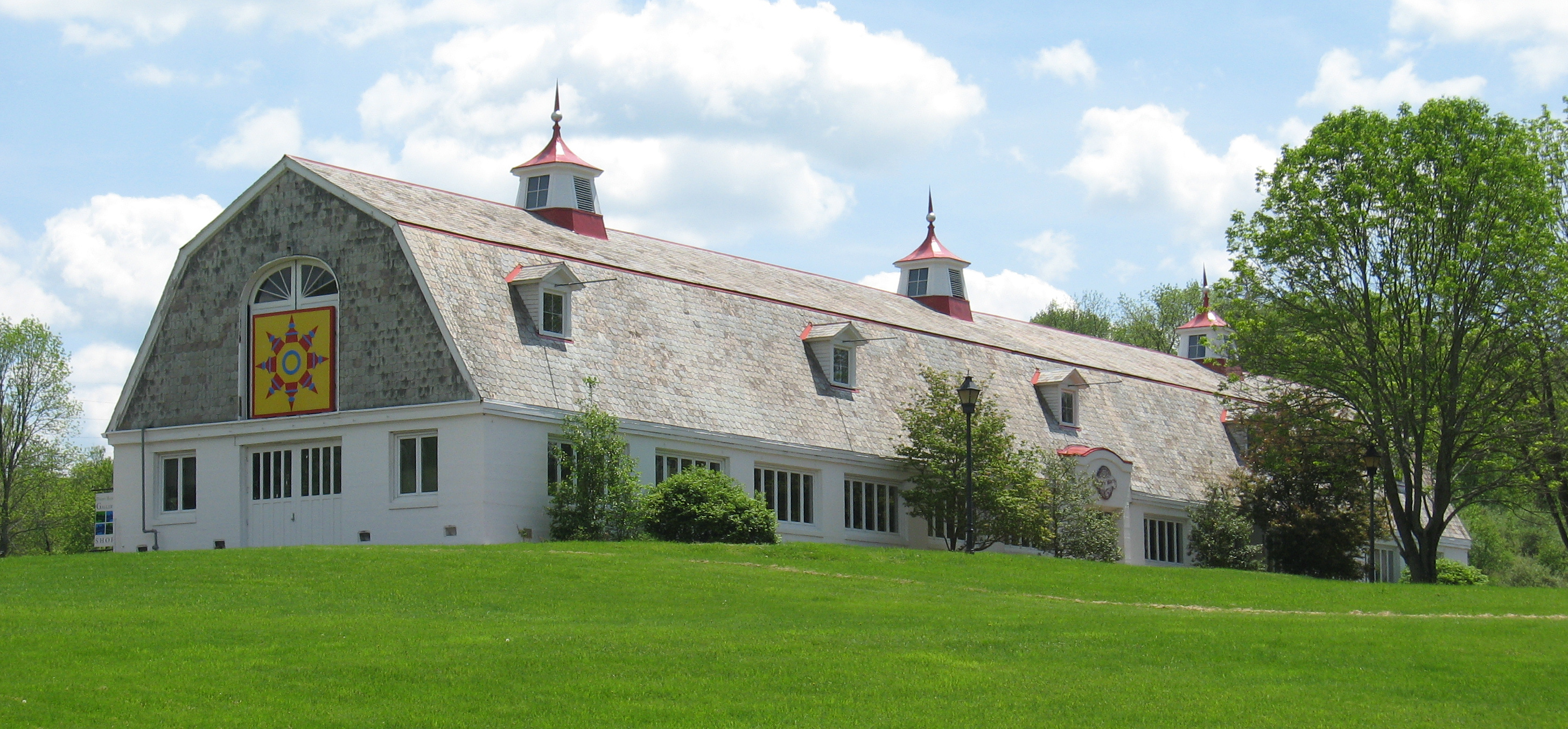
- View from north

- Location within Ohio Location within the United States
- Location: Southwest of Athens, Ohio, off U.S. Route 33
- Coordinates: 39°18′52″N 82°6′55″W
- Area: 2 acres (0.81 ha)
- Built: 1914
- Architectural style: Colonial Revival, Georgian Revival
- NRHP reference No.: 78002003
- Added to NRHP: April 25, 1978

The Athens State Hospital Cow Barn is a historical agriculture building, art gallery, and cultural heritage center on the grounds of the former state hospital in Athens, Ohio, United States. One of several agricultural buildings associated with the hospital, it has been named a historic site.

The Athens State Hospital was founded in 1874, pursuant to legislation enacted seven years prior. Within three years, the hospital was contracting with a local blacksmith to buy milk from his dairy, but by the early twentieth century, this arrangement had proven inconvenient, and in 1912 the hospital bought the farm associated with the dairy operation. Two years later, the present cow barn was erected near the old farmhouse. This was a time of expansion for the hospital complex, which retains numerous buildings from the beginning of the twentieth century; like much of the rest of the hospital, the cow barn displays Colonial Revival architectural influences, unlike the substantially older farmhouse next door. The barn itself is a linear concrete building with some shingles on the walls, a concrete foundation, and a slate-covered gambrel roof. Three towers are placed on the roofline, while dormer windows pierce the lower part of the roof at regular intervals. A prominent entryway is set in the middle of the long side of the building, with six window-filled bays to each side.

In 1978, the old cow barn was listed on the National Register of Historic Places, qualifying both because of its place in local history and because of its historically significant architecture. Two years later, much of the state hospital complex was designated a historic district and listed on the Register, but the cow barn was not included, as it lies 0.5 miles (0.80 km) away from the rest of the complex.

== Current use and trails ==
No longer in agricultural use, the barn has been converted into an art gallery, the Dairy Barn Arts Center. Next to the property, on bequeathed land, is the Ora Anderson Trail; a densely wooded elevated trail that spans the hillside in back of the Dairy Barn. Complete with showcased letters written by Ora, the trail has become a mainstay of the Dairy Lane ecotourism.
