= Akil Marshall =

Website
- akilmarshall.com

Akil Marshall is an American author, speaker, and educational consultant in Cleveland, Ohio.

He is CEO of the Akil Marshall Organization (TAMO), founder of Dance Afrika Dance (DAD) and has been teaching young people since 1992. The goal of TAMO is to teach young people skills for success in their careers.

Marshall is the author of five books. His most recently published book is Winning In America: The High 5 Model for American Education. He played professional football and was the first strength and fitness coach for the National Basketball Association (NBA). He was also the first African-American male to host an exercise and fitness television show in the United States.

In 2006 he was awarded the Dr. Martin Luther King Jr. Community Service Award, Cleveland.
