= Levi Scofield =

American architect

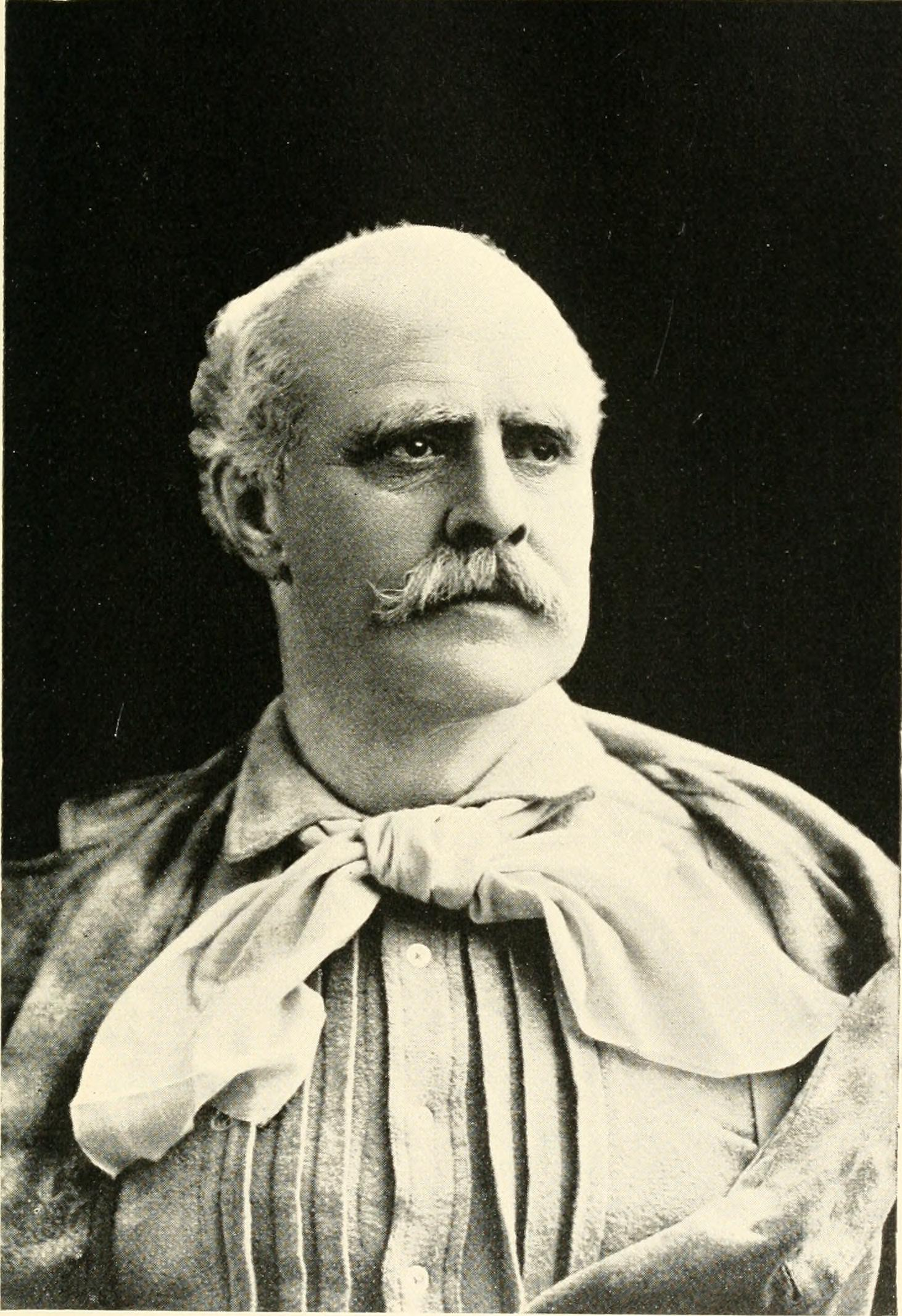
- Born: November 9, 1842; Cleveland, Ohio
- Died: February 25, 1917 (aged 74); Cleveland, Ohio
- Burial place: Lake View Cemetery
- Occupation(s): Architect, Sculptor
- Known for: Soldiers' and Sailors' Monument (Cleveland), Ohio State Reformatory

Levi Tucker Scofield (originally Schofield) (November 9, 1842– February 25, 1917) was a prominent architect and sculptor from Cleveland, Ohio. He served as a captain in the 103rd OVI in the American Civil War and designed many public buildings and several monuments during his career. He was a third generation Cleveland resident and the Schofield Building, which he designed, is named after him.

== Early life ==
Scofield was born in Cleveland to William Benedict and Mary Scofield. His grandfather, Benjamin Scofield, came to the city in 1816 from New York and was responsible for the construction of many of Cleveland's earliest buildings. In 1856, Scofield's father built the Scofield Block on Erie Street out of which his mother ran a boardinghouse on the second and third floors. Scofield attended Cleveland Public Schools and trained as a builder and architect, working under his father.

== Civil War ==
In 1861, at the age of 19, Scofield briefly joined Battery D of the 1st Ohio Light Artillery under the command of Colonel James Barnett, mustering out only a month later. In July 1862 he was commissioned as a 2nd lieutenant of the 103rd Ohio Volunteer Infantry, eventually attaining the rank of captain in 1864. During his service, he served largely as an engineer on the staff of Jacob Dolson Cox. Scofield published a book in 1909 detailing his experiences during The Battle of Franklin.

== Career ==
Following the war, he briefly worked in New York before returning to Cleveland. Scofield's architectural work is broad and included institutional buildings, residences, and public art. Some of his more well-known projects included the Athens Lunatic Asylum (1868), a Kirkbride plan psychiatric hospital in Athens, Ohio, now on the campus of Ohio University; and the Ohio State Reformatory (1886) in Mansfield, Ohio which served as the backdrop of the film The Shawshank Redemption (1994). His firm designed five Cleveland Public Schools between 1869 and 1883.

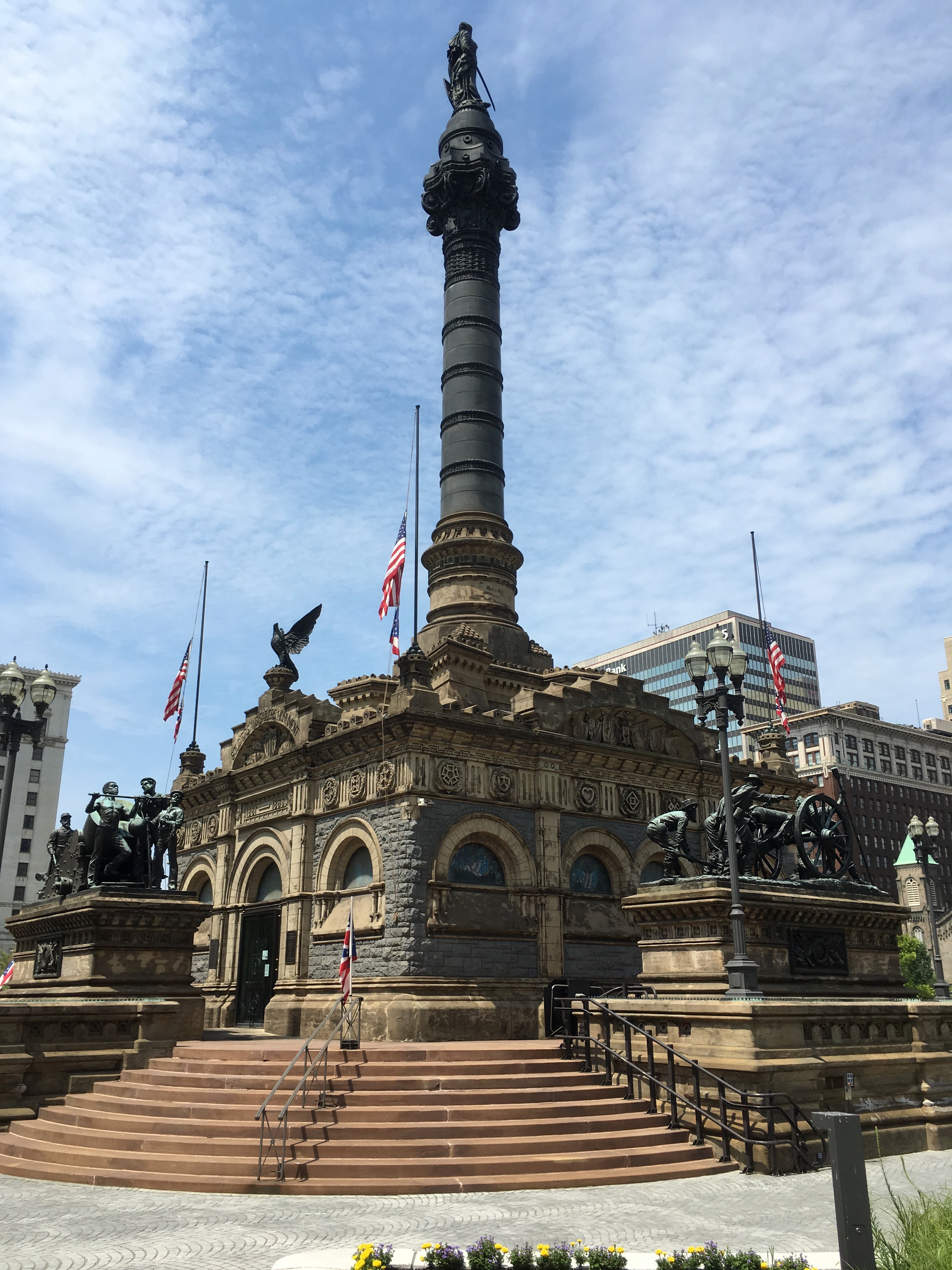
The Cuyahoga County Soldiers' and Sailors' Monument (1894)

Scofield was part of a commission established to construct a memorial to those from Cuyahoga County who served in the Civil War. The commission included a number of prominent local veterans including General James Barnett. Despite significant resistance, the southeast quadrant of Cleveland's Public Square was selected as the location for the structure. Scofield served as both chief architect as well as sculptor for what would become the Cuyahoga County Soldiers' and Sailors' Monument. Both Barnett and Scofield are honored with busts above either main doors. Scofield's name is listed on tablet 14. The monument opened in 1894 with a dedication ceremony attended by William McKinley. It remains open to the public and free to visit to this day. Scofield also designed a well-known statue called These Are My Jewels which is a Civil War monument currently on the grounds of the Ohio Statehouse It was initially exhibited at the World's Columbian Exposition in Chicago in 1893.

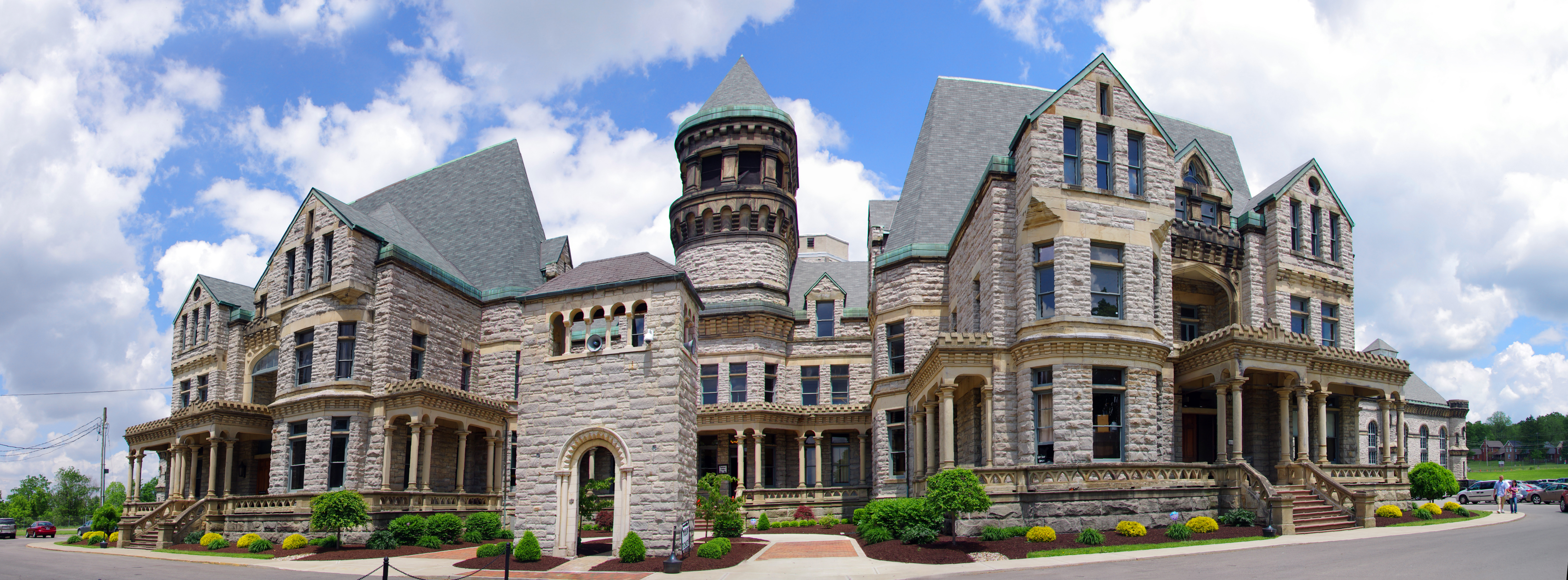
Ohio State Reformatory, Mansfield, Ohio (1886)

In 1901, Scofield began construction of the Schofield Building, a 14-story structure that would serve as the headquarters of his architectural firm. During construction, a worker named William O’Neal was injured when a wall collapsed, burying him. Scofield was arrested on September 16, 1901, for violating local building codes which lead to the unsafe conditions that caused O'Neal's injury. He was later acquitted due to insufficient evidence. In October 1901, a man fell from the building. Scofield was not arrested due to the intervention of Cleveland mayor Tom L. Johnson who suggested the contractor be arrested instead. Upon completion, Scofield's office was located on the Northwest corner of the building on the top floor which allowed him to look down across Euclid Avenue towards the completed Soldiers' and Sailors' Monument in Public Square. The building's red terra cotta facade was modernized in 1969 with a steel and enamel facade. The building was restored in 2019 for around $50 million which included the removal of the modernized facade. The building now serves as the Kimpton Schofield Hotel and the Schofield Residences.

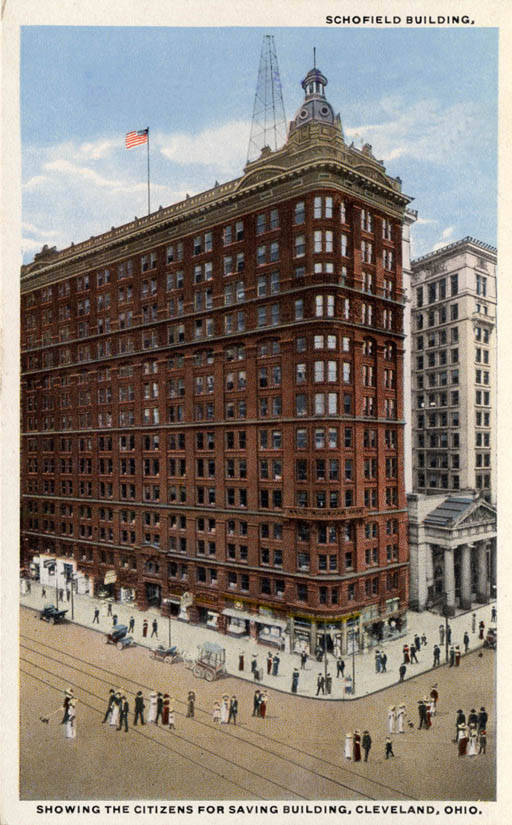
Schofield Building

Scofield's personal residence was built in Cleveland's Buckeye-Woodhill neighborhood in 1898. Since then, the mansion has fallen into significant disrepair. Efforts are underway to preserve and restore the structure.

== Personal life ==
Scofield married Elizabeth Clark Wright in 1867. Together they had five children: William, Donald, Sherman, Harriet, and Douglas. Scofield's four sons all worked at his architectural firm. The Scofields were members of First Baptist Church of Greater Cleveland. Elizabeth Scofield died in 1914 and is interred at Lake View Cemetery in a mausoleum designed by her husband. Three years later, in 1917, Scofield died at his home. He too is interred in the family mausoleum. The Scofield mausoleum was used as a temporary resting place for assassinated president James A. Garfield in 1881 while the construction of his memorial was undertaken nearby.

Scofield was the first Cleveland architect taken into membership in the American Institute of Architects. He was known to be a friend and golfing partner of John D. Rockefeller.

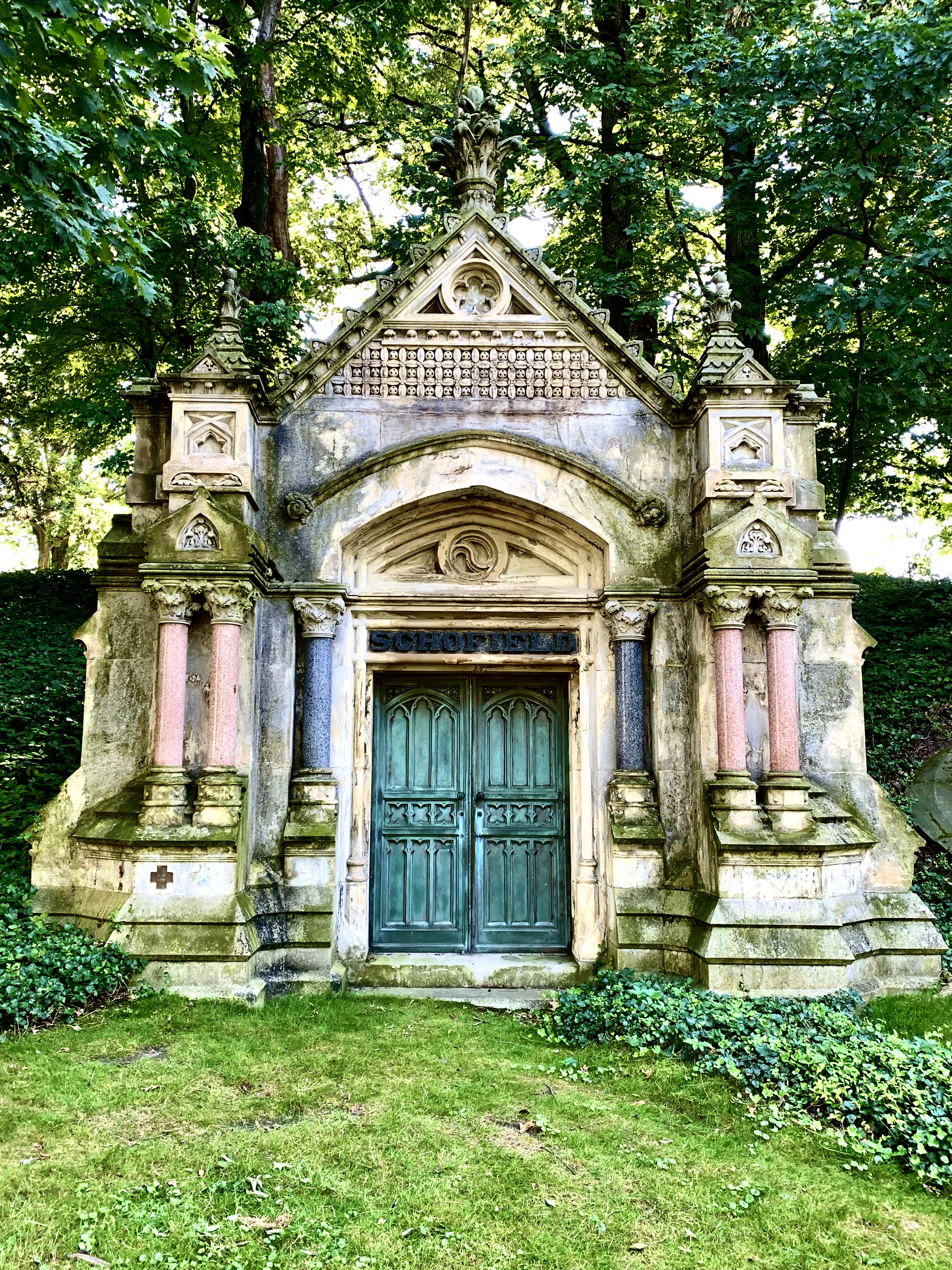
Schofield family mausoleum at Lake View Cemetery. Levi T. Scofield designed the structure and is interred there following his death in 1917.

== Projects ==
- Schofield Building (Euclid Ninth Tower) (1902) 2000-2034 East 9th Street
- Cuyahoga County Soldiers and Sailors Monument (1894), Scofield worked on the Civil War monument for seven and a half years without compensation and contributed over $57,000 to its cost.
- Athens Lunatic Asylum, Athens, Ohio
- Asylum for the Insane, Columbus, Ohio
- North Carolina Penitentiary
- Cleveland House of Corrections
- These Are My Jewels, a Civil War Monument installed at the World's Columbian Exposition in Chicago in 1893, and then moved to the grounds of the Ohio State Capitol
- Ohio State Reformatory, Mansfield, Ohio
