= Ohio State Reformatory =

- U.S. National Register of Historic Places
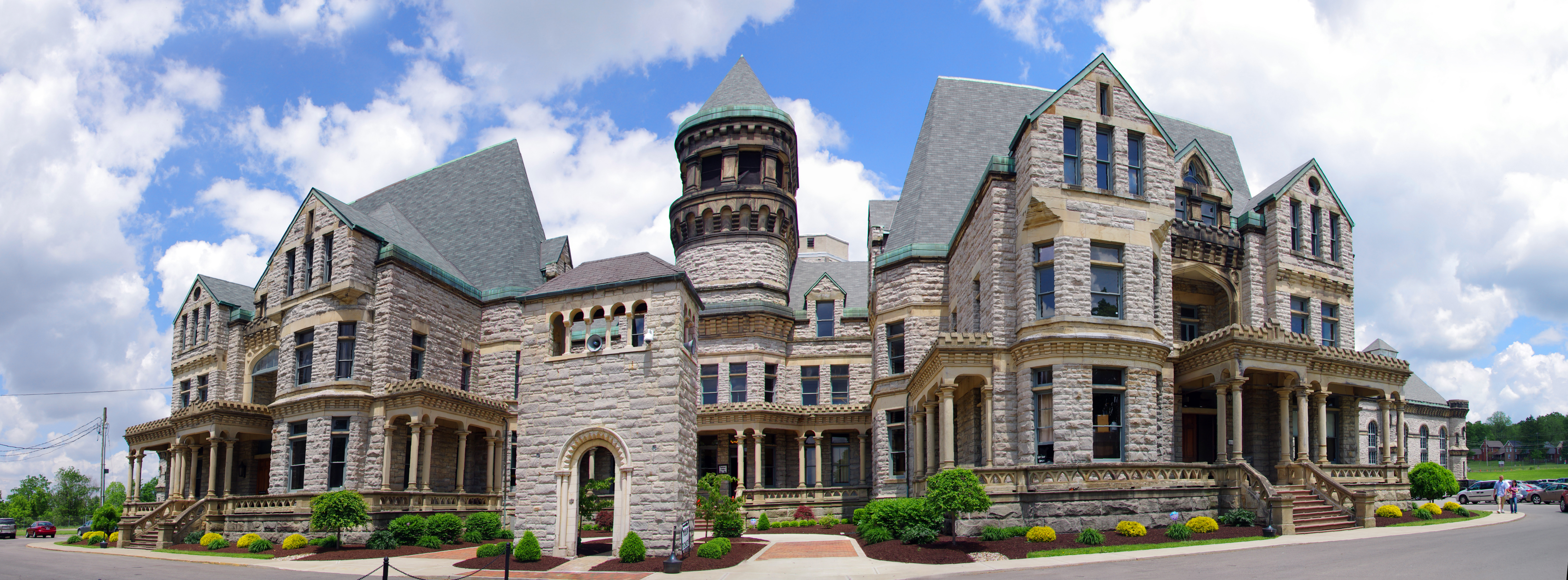
- Ohio State Reformatory

- Location within Ohio Location within the United States
- Location: 100 Reformatory Road, Mansfield, Ohio
- Coordinates: 40°47′07″N 82°30′18″W
- Area: 40 acres (16 ha)
- Built: Began: 1886 Completed: 1910
- Architect: Levi T. Scofield
- Architectural style: Romanesque Revival
- NRHP reference No.: 83002039
- Added to NRHP: April 14, 1983

The Ohio State Reformatory (OSR), also known as the Mansfield Reformatory, is a historic prison located in Mansfield, Ohio in the United States. It was built between 1886 and 1910 and remained in operation until 1990, when a United States Federal Court ruling (the 'Boyd Consent Decree') ordered the facility to be closed. While this facility was seen in a number of films (including several while the facility was still in operation), TV shows and music videos, it was made famous by the film The Shawshank Redemption (1994) when it was used for most scenes of the movie. The Ohio State Reformatory is currently open to tourists.

== History ==
The history of the Ohio State Reformatory began in 1862: the field where the reformatory would be built was used as a training camp for Civil War soldiers. The camp was named Camp Mordecai Bartley in honor of the Mansfield man who served as the Governor of Ohio from 1844 to 1846.

The Intermediate (Ohio State Reformatory) was intended as just that, a halfway point between the Boys Industrial School in Lancaster, Ohio and the State Penitentiary in Columbus, Ohio for first-time offenders. Construction began in 1886 and remained under construction until 1910 due to funding problems which caused construction delays.

The exterior of Ohio State Reformatory

The original architect for the design was Levi T. Scofield from Cleveland, Ohio, who used three architectural styles; Victorian Gothic, Richardsonian Romanesque and Queen Anne. The exterior of the building, which is built from brick and concrete, is designed in the Romanesque style giving the frontage a castle–like appearance. Scofield designed the reformatory with these unique styles to help encourage inmates to become reborn back into their spiritual lives. The creation and construction of the entire building was entrusted to architect Friedrich Ferdinand Schnitzer, whose name also appears on the cornerstone, and is recorded as Superintendent and Supervising Architect on documents. In 1891, the name was changed from Intermediate Penitentiary to Ohio State Reformatory.

On September 15, 1896, the reformatory opened its doors to its first 150 criminals. These prisoners were brought by train from Columbus and put immediately to work on the prison sewer system and the 25–foot stone wall surrounding the complex.

Arthur Lewis Glattke was the longest serving warden of Ohio State Reformatory from 1935-1959. Glattke's wife, Helen died several days after she was accidentally shot when a handgun fell and discharged. Arthur Glattke died following a heart attack suffered in his office in 1959.

The prison cemetery contains over 200 prisoners who died while incarcerated as well as two prison guards.

Urban Wilford and Frank Hanger were killed in the line of duty during escape attempts.

=== Closure ===
Cellblock at the Ohio State Reformatory

The Reformatory remained in full operation until December 1990 when it was closed via federal court order. As the result of a prisoners' class action suit citing overcrowding and inhumane conditions (Boyd v. Denton, C.A. 78-1054A (N.D.Oh.)), District Judge Frank J. Battisti of the United States District Court for the Northern District of Ohio ordered the prison closed by the end of December 1986. This order was known as the Boyd Consent Decree. The closing date was moved to 1990 due to delays in constructing the replacement facility, the Mansfield Correctional Institution, which stands to the north of the old prison, where the yard, power plant, and other buildings once stood.

Following the reformatory's closure, its walls and outbuildings were demolished. In 1995, the Mansfield Reformatory Preservation Society was formed. The society operates the reformatory as a historic attraction, offering tours and undertaking preservation and restoration projects.

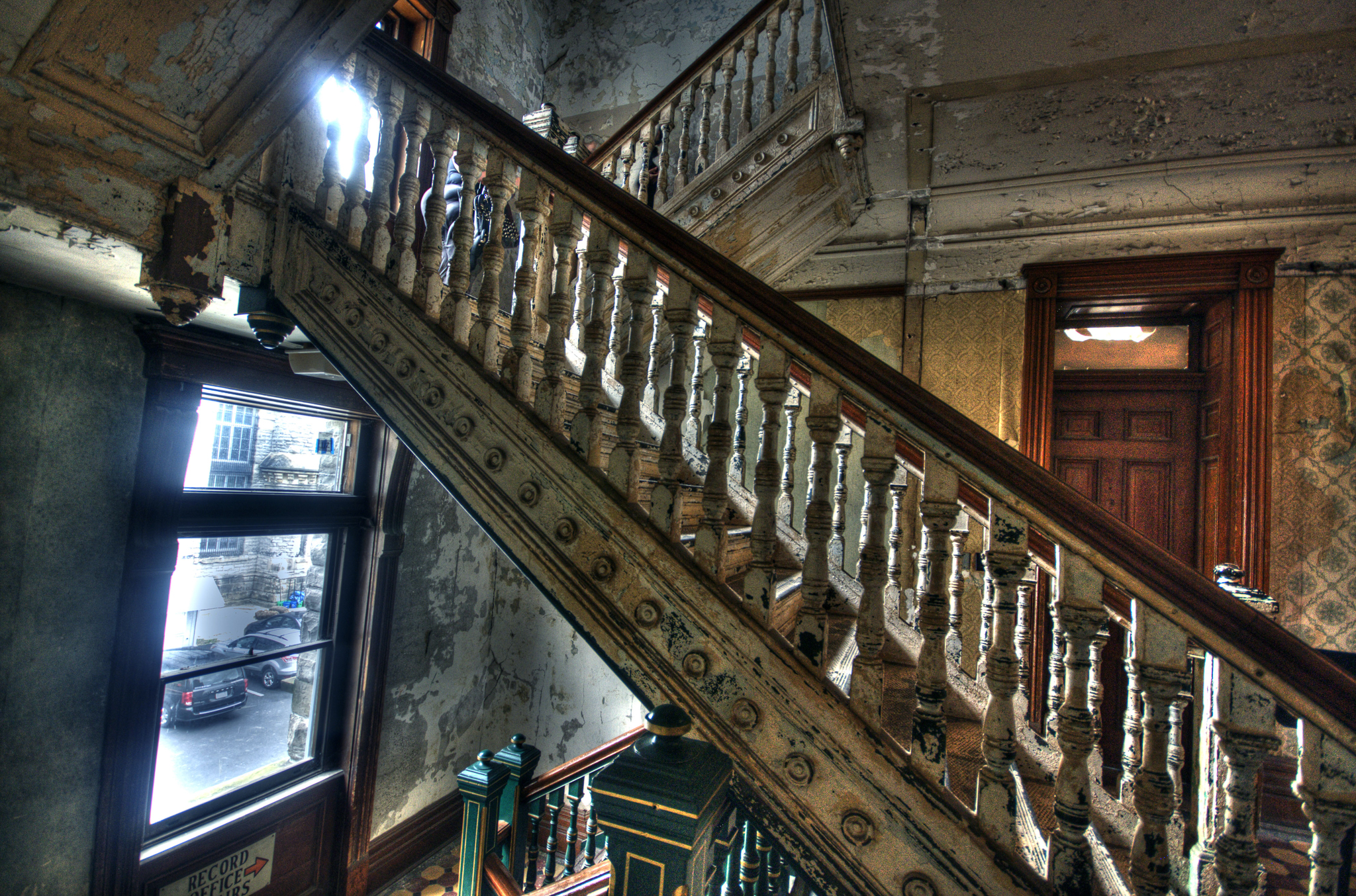
Interior, steel staircase

The six-tier East Cell Block has been listed by Guinness World Records as the world's largest free-standing cell block.

== Restoration ==
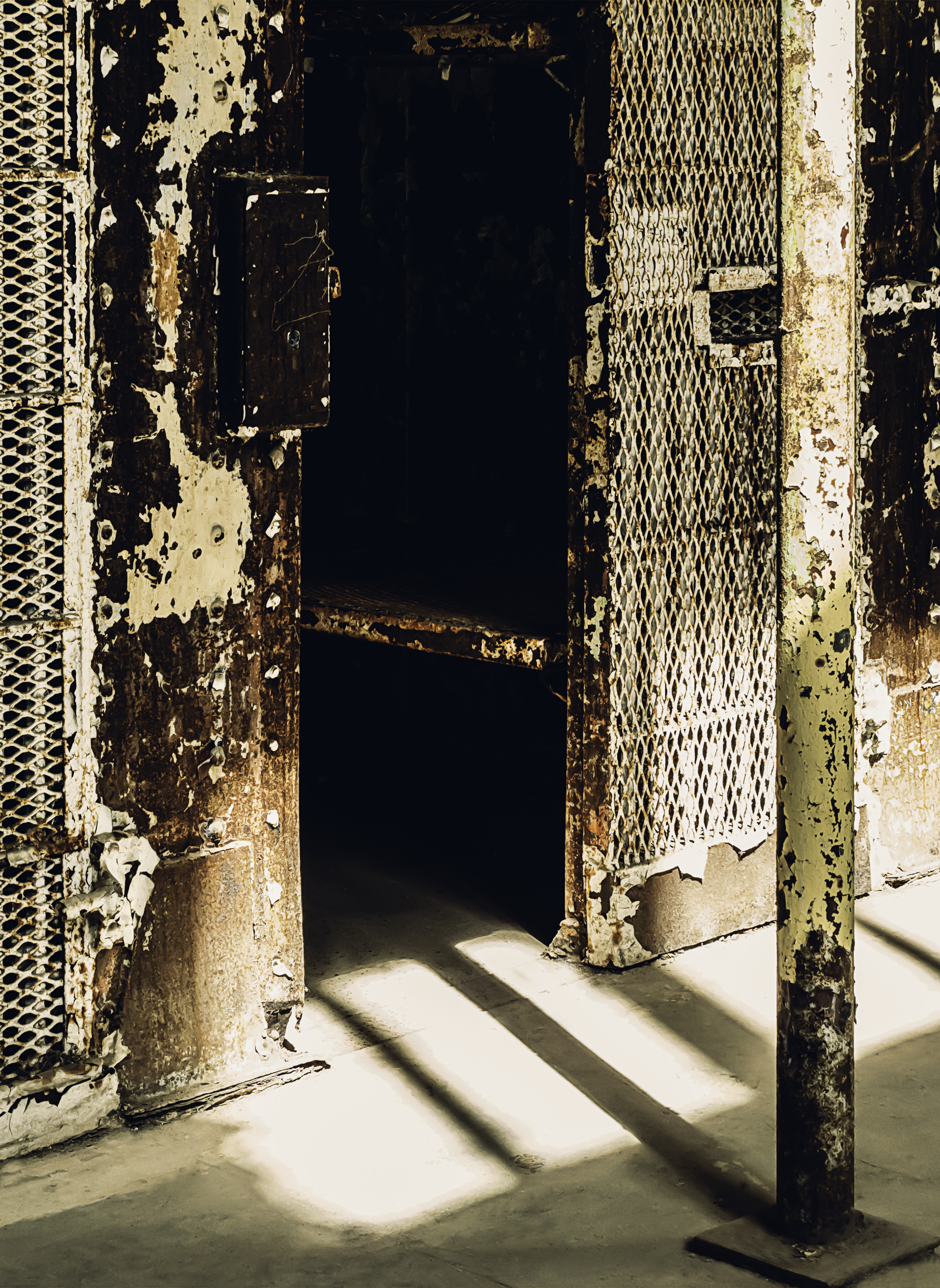
Single cell

The Mansfield Reformatory Preservation Society continues to restore and preserve the facility. Restoration projects have included structural repairs, window replacement, flooring repairs, and restoration of interior spaces.

Donations to the Mansfield Reformatory Preservation Society support maintenance and restoration of the building. Restoration work has included the repair and replacement of windows throughout the reformatory.

Throughout the Halloween season, the building hosts a haunted house through Blood Prison.

The Ohio State Reformatory offers self-guided and guided tours of the historic prison. The reformatory also offers paronormal programs, including ghost walks, public ghost hunts, private paranormal investigations, and educational paranormal programs.

The Ohio Corrections Museum at the reformatory displays the original electric chair from the Ohio Penitentiary, which was used for 315 executions.

== Events ==
The Shawshank Redemption 30th Anniversary Celebration was hosted August 9–11, 2024.

The Ohio State Reformatory hosts several recurring events throughout the year, including the INKcarceration Music & Tattoo Festival, a rock and metal festival that began in 2018, ParaPsyCon, and the Shawshank Hustle, a 7K race whose course passes filming locations from The Shawshank Redemption.

== In popular culture ==
- Harry and Walter Go to New York (1976) Prison scenes were filmed at the Ohio State Reformatory in 1975, with 65 inmates used as extras.
- Tango & Cash (1989) – Prison Scenes were used in Ohio State Reformatory when the prison was still in operation.
- The Shawshank Redemption (1994) – Ohio State Reformatory served as Shawshank State Reformatory, with locations including Warden Norton's Office, Brooks' room, and the central guard room for cafeteria scenes.
- Air Force One (1997) – Ohio State Reformatory was used to depict the scenes of Russian prison where General Ivan Radek was incarcerated.
- Godsmack – "Awake" (2000) The music video was filmed at the Ohio State Reformatory.
- In 2004 Lil Wayne used the Ohio State Reformatory to perform his single "Go DJ".
- Missy May I used the Ohio State Reformatory for their music video "Relentless Chaos."
- In 2018, the Ohio State Reformatory was used for the film Escape Plan: The Extractors with Sylvester Stallone.
- On November 25 and 26, 2019, filming for Judas and the Black Messiah took place at Ohio State Reformatory.
