= Athens Lunatic Asylum =

Coordinates: 39°19′12″N 82°6′34″W

- Athens State Hospital
- U.S. National Register of Historic Places
- U.S. Historic district
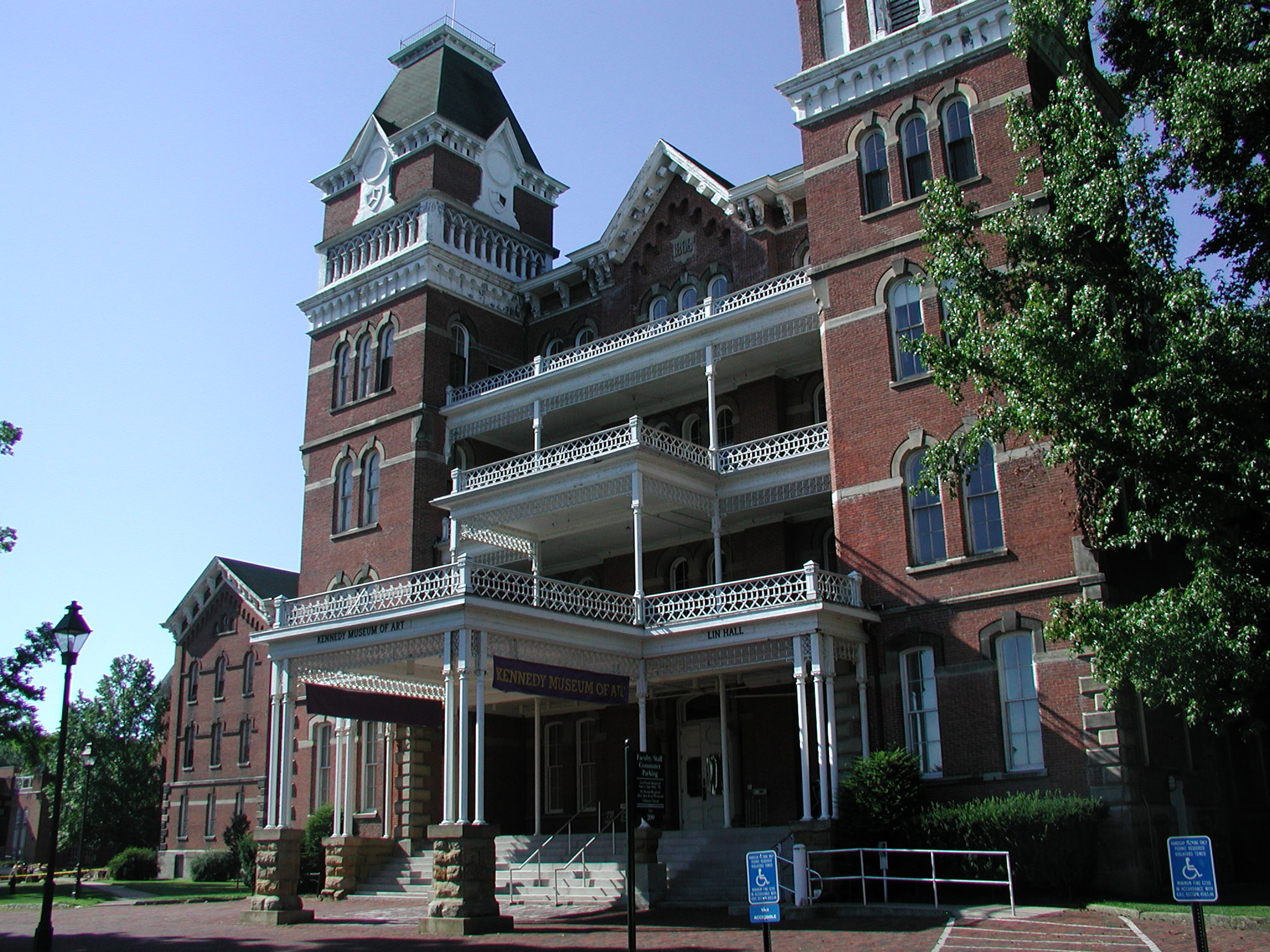

- Location within Ohio Location within the United States
- Location: Athens, Ohio
- Built: 1868
- Architect: Levi T. Scofield
- Architectural style: Late 19th And 20th Century Revivals, Late Victorian
- NRHP reference No.: 80002936
- Added to NRHP: March 11, 1980

The Athens Lunatic Asylum, now a mixed-use development known as The Ridges, was a Kirkbride Plan mental hospital operated in Athens, Ohio, from 1874 until 1993. During its operation, the hospital provided services to a variety of patients including Civil War veterans, children, and those declared mentally unwell. After a period of disuse the property was redeveloped by the state of Ohio. Today, The Ridges are a part of Ohio University and house the Kennedy Museum of Art as well as an auditorium and many offices, classrooms, and storage facilities.

After the hospital's original structure closed, the state of Ohio acquired the property and renamed the complex and its surrounding grounds The Ridges. According to The Guide of Repository Holdings, the term "The Ridges" was derived from a naming contest in 1984 to re-describe the area and its purpose.

== History ==
=== Design and architectural features ===
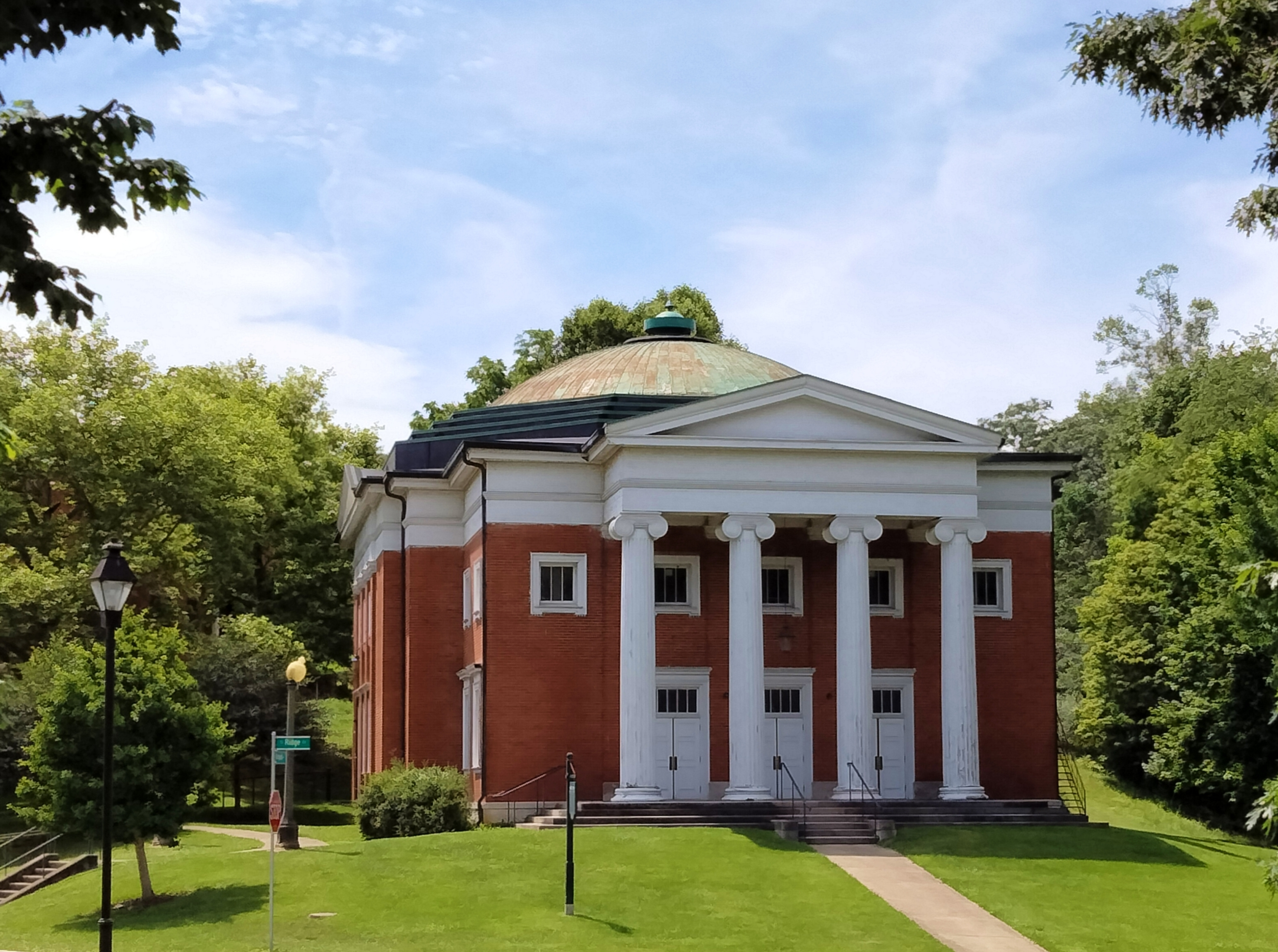
The Ridges Auditorium

Photo of the ballroom before a fire broke out and it was divided into two floors to help ease space restrictions.

The architect for the original building was of Cleveland. The hospital grounds were designed by Herman Haerlin of Cincinnati. Some of Haerlin's other landscape designs are seen in Cincinnati's Spring Grove Cemetery and the Oval on the campus of Ohio State University in Columbus.

The design of the buildings and grounds were influenced by Dr. Thomas Story Kirkbride, a 19th-century physician who authored an influential treatise on hospital design called On the Construction, Organization and General Arrangements of Hospitals for the Insane. Kirkbride Plan asylums are most recognizably characterized by the staggered "bat-wing" floor plan of their wards, High Victorian Gothic architecture, and their sprawling grounds.

In accordance with the Kirkbride Plan, the main building was to include a central administration building with a wing for men on one side and a wing for women on the other, each with their own separate dining halls. There was room to house 572 patients in the main building, almost double Kirkbride's recommendation. The main building itself was 853 feet long and 60 feet in width.

=== Construction ===
The land where the hospital was built originally belonged to the Arthur Coates and Eliakim H. Moore farms. Ground was broken on November 5, 1868. The first iteration of the asylum consisted of only 141 acres (57 ha) and over the years, grew to occupy over 1,000 acres (400 ha) of land and 78 buildings.

=== Operating years (1874-1993) ===
Athens Lunatic Asylum began operation on January 9, 1874. Within two years of its opening, the hospital was renamed The Athens Hospital for the Insane. Later, the hospital would be called the Athens Asylum for the Insane, the Athens State Hospital, the Southeastern Ohio Mental Health Center, the Athens Mental Health Center, the Athens Mental Health and Mental Retardation Center, the Athens Mental Health and Developmental Center, and then (again) the Athens Mental Health Center.

Photo of the first day shift staff. Taken in 1873.

Photo of the first night shift staff. Taken in 1873.

The original hospital was in operation from 1874 to 1993. Although not a wholly self-sustaining facility, many Kirkbride Plan asylums functioned as cloistered communities, and for decades the hospital had livestock, farm fields and gardens, an orchard, greenhouses, a dairy, a physical plant to generate steam heat, and even a carriage shop. A large percentage of the work it took to maintain the facility was originally carried out by patients. Labor, especially skilled labor, was seen by the Kirkbride Plan as a form of therapy and was economically advantageous for the state.

The asylum expanded to include specialized and ancillary buildings such as the Dairy Barn (now an arts center), Beacon School, Athens Receiving Hospital, Center Hospital and the Tubercular Ward ("Cottage B"). Also built onto the main building were a laundry room and a boiler house. Seven cottages, including Cottage B, were constructed to house even more patients. While they had a smaller capacity than the main wards, they allowed for constructive grouping of patients in dormitory-like rooms.

By the 1950s the hospital was the town's largest employer, with 1,800 patients on a 1,019-acre, 78-building campus. At its peak the Athens Lunatic Asylum served Adams, Athens, Gallia, Highland, Hocking, Jackson, Lawrence, Meigs, Morgan, Perry, Pike, Ross, Scioto, Vinton and Washington counties.

=== Decline and closure ===
The mental healthcare industry in the United States underwent a sea change in the 1950s. Research began to show that the mentally ill did not pose an inherent danger to their communities. The public became increasingly aware of procedures like electroshock therapy and the lobotomy, which would come to be seen as cruel, unnecessary, and inhumane. The availability of psychoactive drugs for the treatment of mental illnesses, as well as the increasing prevalence of psychological therapy, allowed for most patients to be treated without the need for internment in a prison-like institution. The asylum, among many others, declined throughout the latter half of the 20th century and eventually closed in 1993. However, the state hospital continued to function in Athens, with some patients and staff relocating to a newly constructed facility which, at the time of the transition in 1993, was called the Southeast Psychiatric Hospital. The psychiatric hospital in Athens - visible from the asylum - is now named Appalachian Behavioral Healthcare.

== Modern history and present day ==
=== 1990s ===
By the early 1990s, many of the original buildings had fallen into disrepair, following a similar pattern of decline and neglect among Kirkbride Plan asylums. As the mental healthcare industry transitioned away from large, centralized institutions, the will to support sprawling hospital complexes diminished. Large asylums were slowly phased out, with most operations shifting to small outpatient centers scattered throughout the community. Because the asylums were typically located on a hill outside of the nearest municipal center, their degradation was able to occur out of sight and out of mind. Under private ownership, abandoned Kirkbrides often languished unmaintained and unsecured, slowly being reclaimed by nature, as with Hudson River State Hospital in New York. Since abandoned structures represent a serious insurance liability, there is incentive for the property owner to secure them, and abandoned property owned by colleges and universities may be especially easy targets for urban exploration, squatting, or vandalism by members of the student body or the general public.

In 1993 the Athens Lunatic Asylum's property was deeded over to Ohio University in a land swap with the state's Department of Mental Health. Under the ownership of Ohio University, the property was kept in relatively good shape and was maintained for reuse.

=== 2000s and 2010s ===
With urban exploration and modern ruins occupying a growing niche of public consciousness through entertainment and media, Kirkbride Plan asylums have enjoyed renewed public attention in the 2000s and 2010s. Two historically significant Kirkbrides, Danvers State Hospital in Massachusetts and the aforementioned Hudson River State Hospital in New York, fell into dangerous disrepair in the 1990s and 2000s and eventually underwent partial demolition to make way for new development.

At Athens, the ownership of a stable funding authority (Ohio University) has ensured restoration of much of the original grounds, as envisioned by the original planners, in a mixed-use university development called The Ridges.

Most buildings have been renovated and turned into classrooms and office buildings. The administration building is now the home of Kennedy Museum of Art , showcasing paintings and artwork of all different types of artists. The Dairy Barn Southeastern Ohio Cultural Arts Center, a nonprofit arts organization, is located in the old hospital's remodeled dairy barn; it is privately owned and operated. The Dairy Barn operates a calendar for sculpting and exhibits. The George V. Voinovich School of Leadership and Public Affairs is also located at The Ridges, in a set of three separate buildings across the area.

The old tubercular ward, "Cottage B", which sat on a hill separated from the other buildings, was demolished by Ohio University in 2013 due to the large number of college students exploring the dangerous structure. Cottage B was designed to early 1900s fireproofing standards and incorporated copious asbestos lining inside the walls, making it difficult to remediate.

Members of the Athens, Ohio, chapter of NAMI, the National Alliance on Mental Illness, have worked to restore the three graveyards located on the grounds of The Ridges. School organizations provide tours of the facility around Halloween time each year. The preserve is also regularly used by the school's Army ROTC battalion.

== Treatment and quality of care ==
The first patient of the Asylum was a 14-year-old girl with epilepsy, thought to be possessed by a demon. Epilepsy was considered a major cause of "insanity" and reason for admission to the hospital in the early years. The first annual report lists thirty-one men and nineteen women as having their insanity caused by epilepsy. General "ill health" accounted for the admission of thirty-nine men and forty-four women in the first three years of the hospital's operation.

Ailments such as menopause, alcohol addiction, and tuberculosis were cause for enrollment in the hospital. For the female patients hospitalized during these first three years of the asylum's operation, the three leading causes of insanity are recorded as "puerperal condition" (51 women), "change of life" (32 women), and "menstrual derangements" (29 women). Women with postpartum depression or "hysteria" were labeled insane and sent to recover in the institution. Women were often institutionalized for unnecessary or outright fallacious reasons.

The second-most common cause of insanity, as recorded in the first annual report, was "intemperance and dissipation". In the hospital's first three years of operation, according to the annual report of 1876, eighty-one men and one woman were diagnosed as having their insanity caused by masturbation. Fifty-six men and one woman were diagnosed as having their insanity caused by "intemperance and dissipation" during this same period of time.

Records from the asylum document some of the now-discredited theories of the causes of mental illness, as well as the practice of harmful treatments, such as lobotomy. The Ohio University archives collection information regarding employees' background training, which ranged from full training and qualification to a complete lack thereof. Most disturbing is the documentation of hydrotherapy, electroshock, lobotomy, and early psychotropic drugs, many of which have been discredited today as extremely inhumane ways of treating a patient.

== Cemeteries ==
Myths and mystery surround a well-known site in southern Ohio, The Athens Lunatic Asylum. The mystery is fueled, perhaps, because the public cannot access a majority of the information about patients who were treated and lived at the asylum. With special permission and filling out paperwork that is required by the state of Ohio, some of the information can be accessed, however, those interested in finding out about the patients that walked through the doors of the Asylum can satisfy their curiosity by looking to the cemeteries.

"There are 1,930 people buried at the three cemeteries located at the Ridges. Of those, 700 women and 959 men lay under the headstones marked only with a number." There were some patients who had died that were reunited with their families and buried in cemeteries around their homes. By 1943, the State of Ohio began putting names, births, and deaths, on the markers of the patients who died.(Friends of Asylum, McCabe) It is unknown as to why the state switched from using only numbers to using names in order to verify who the deceased were, but this practice remained constant through the remainder of time that patients were buried up at the asylum. Although the newer stones had names, births, and deaths, the older stones that remained had not been replaced until recently.

By the 1980s the state no longer took care of the cemeteries which made it easy for outsiders to vandalize them. Natural occurrences also caused damage. The stones marking where patients were buried were in desperate need of repair. They were left to the elements and "hundreds of stones were left uprooted and broken."

Beginning in 2000, the Athens, Ohio, chapter of the National Alliance on Mental Illness (NAMI) started the reclamation for the cemeteries, taking on the work that was once the responsibility of the Ohio Department of Mental Health." NAMI, Athens worked to help restore the cemeteries at the Asylum to its original state. The organization got "involved with other groups and organizations in a major effort to restore, beautify and demystify the three mental health grave yards located on the grounds of the old psychiatric hospital complex on The Ridges." "Since nearly the time of the opening of the cemeteries the State of Ohio has allowed families to erect private markers at the graves of their loved ones, There are very few graves marked in such a way, most likely because descendants are unaware of the opportunity."

A passionate advocate for reform, Ohio First Lady Frances Strickland spoke in remembrance of the prisoners during a Mental Health Month event at the pine forest cemetery section, May 2010.

Since the take over, more information has been found out about the patients that are buried in the three cemeteries. A large portion of the information that has been recovered is about the veterans that had spent the remaining days of their lives at the Asylum. Many of these veterans did not receive honors and only 19 have had any recognition. There are 80 veterans that are buried at the Ridges. Of these veterans two fought in the Mexican War, sixty-eight fought in the Civil War, one was a member in the Confederate Army and another two veterans served with the United States Colored infantry. There are three veterans who served in the Spanish–American War, and seven fought in World War I. Some of the other veterans that are buried here were active duty in the late 19th century and the early 20th century.

NAMI has also done other things to honor those who have served our country as well as the other patients who are buried in the cemeteries at the Ridges. Besides helping replace grave stones and keeping the grounds in proper condition, in 2005, the Ridges Cemeteries Committee has been organizing Memorial Day Ceremonies for the many veterans buried at the asylum. "Prior to 2005, the veterans had never received such honors. Indeed, neither they nor the others in those cemeteries had received more than a very austere burial - no personalized service whatsoever." NAMI started the Memorial Day Ceremonies to help restore dignity to the patients on the Ridges and to help recognize the sacrifice of the veterans, many who had probably suffered through post traumatic stress disorder as well as other post war symptoms.

"To find these "lost" veterans, they were found "through a special search within a broader research project to find background information on the over 1,900 patients buried in the Asylum's three cemeteries. With the Help of the Athens County Veterans Service Office and a special appropriation from the Athens county Commissioners flag stands and flags have been placed at the graves of all the veterans in the three cemeteries."

== Trivia ==
Kirkbride Plan asylums occupy a niche in the culture. As more than 70 were built across the nation (with 25 surviving as of 2019) they are a uniquely accessible and idyllic representation of the allures of urban exploration. Kirkbride Plan asylums have appeared in films and television, been the subjects of notable photographers, and inspired fictional locations such as Arkham Asylum in Batman and Parsons State Insane Asylum in Fallout 4.

== See also ==
- Walter Freeman
