= Found object =

Non-standard material used in work of art

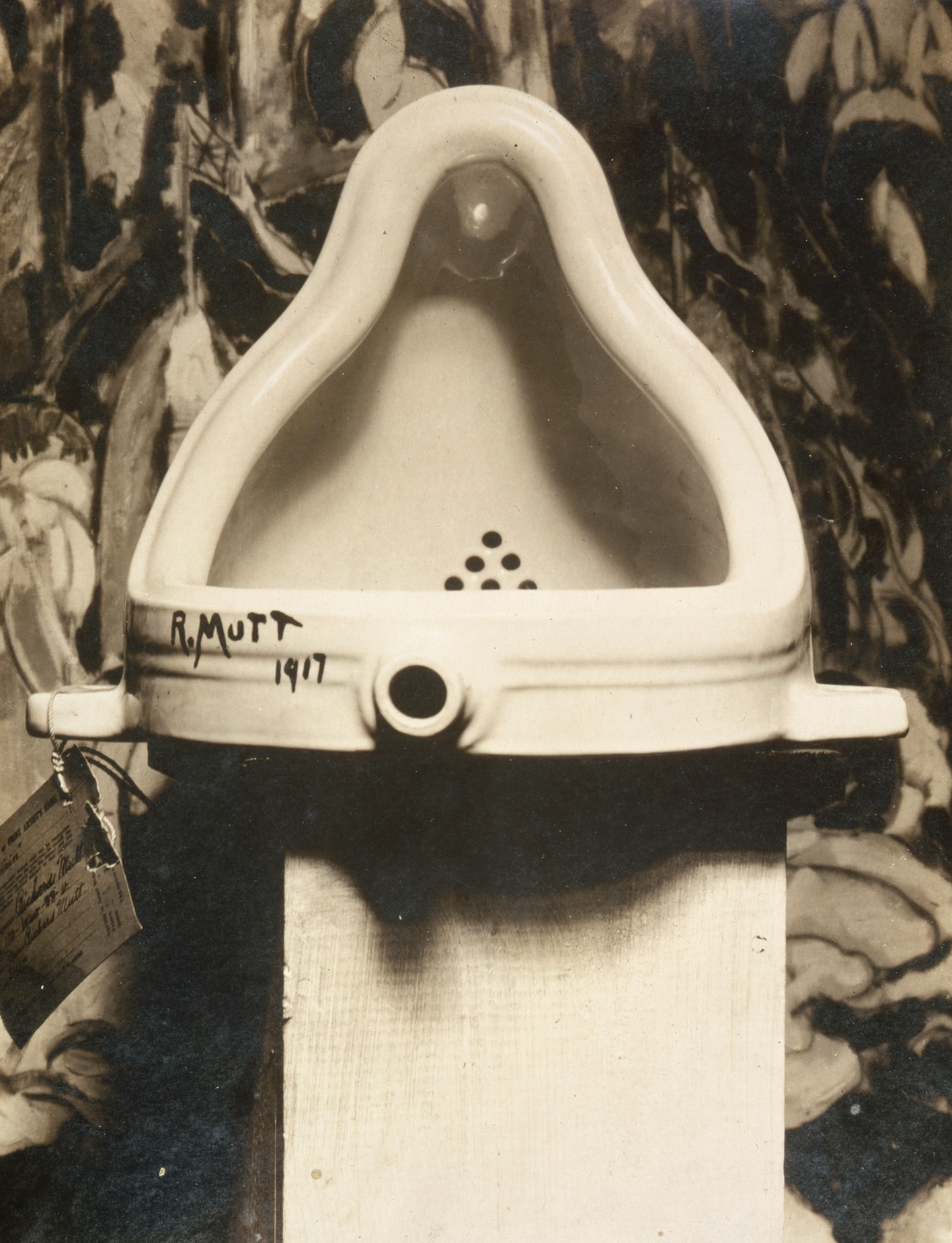
Marcel Duchamp, Fountain, 1917; photograph by Alfred Stieglitz

A found object (a calque from the French objet trouvé), or found art, is art created from undisguised, but often modified, items or products that are not normally considered materials from which art is made, often because they already have a non-art function. Pablo Picasso first publicly utilized the idea when he pasted a printed image of chair caning onto his painting titled Still Life with Chair Caning (1912). Marcel Duchamp is thought to have perfected the concept several years later when he made a series of readymades, consisting of completely unaltered everyday objects selected by Duchamp and designated as art. The most famous example is Fountain (1917), a standard urinal purchased from a hardware store and displayed on a pedestal, resting on its back. In its strictest sense the term "readymade" is applied exclusively to works produced by Marcel Duchamp, who borrowed the term from the clothing industry (French: prêt-à-porter, lit. 'ready-to-wear') while living in New York, and especially to works dating from 1913 to 1921.

Found objects derive their identity as art from the designation placed upon them by the artist and from the social history that comes with the object. This may be indicated by either its anonymous wear and tear (as in collages of Kurt Schwitters) or by its recognizability as a consumer icon (as in the sculptures of Haim Steinbach). The context into which it is placed is also a highly relevant factor. The idea of dignifying commonplace objects in this way was originally a shocking challenge to the accepted distinction between what was considered art as opposed to not art. Although it may now be accepted in the art world as a viable practice, it continues to arouse questioning, as with the Tate Gallery's Turner Prize exhibition of Tracey Emin's My Bed, which consisted literally of a transposition of her unmade and disheveled bed, surrounded by shed clothing and other bedroom detritus, directly from her bedroom to the Tate. In this sense the artist gives the audience time and a stage to contemplate an object. As such, found objects can prompt philosophical reflection in the observer ranging from disgust to indifference to nostalgia to empathy.

As an art form, found objects tend to include the artist's output—at the very least an idea about it, i.e. the artist's designation of the object as art—which is nearly always reinforced with a title. There is usually some degree of modification of the found object, although not always to the extent that it cannot be recognized, as is the case with readymades. Recent critical theory, however, would argue that the mere designation and relocation of any object, readymades included, constitutes a modification of the object because it changes our perception of its utility, its lifespan, or its status.

== History ==
=== Antecedents ===
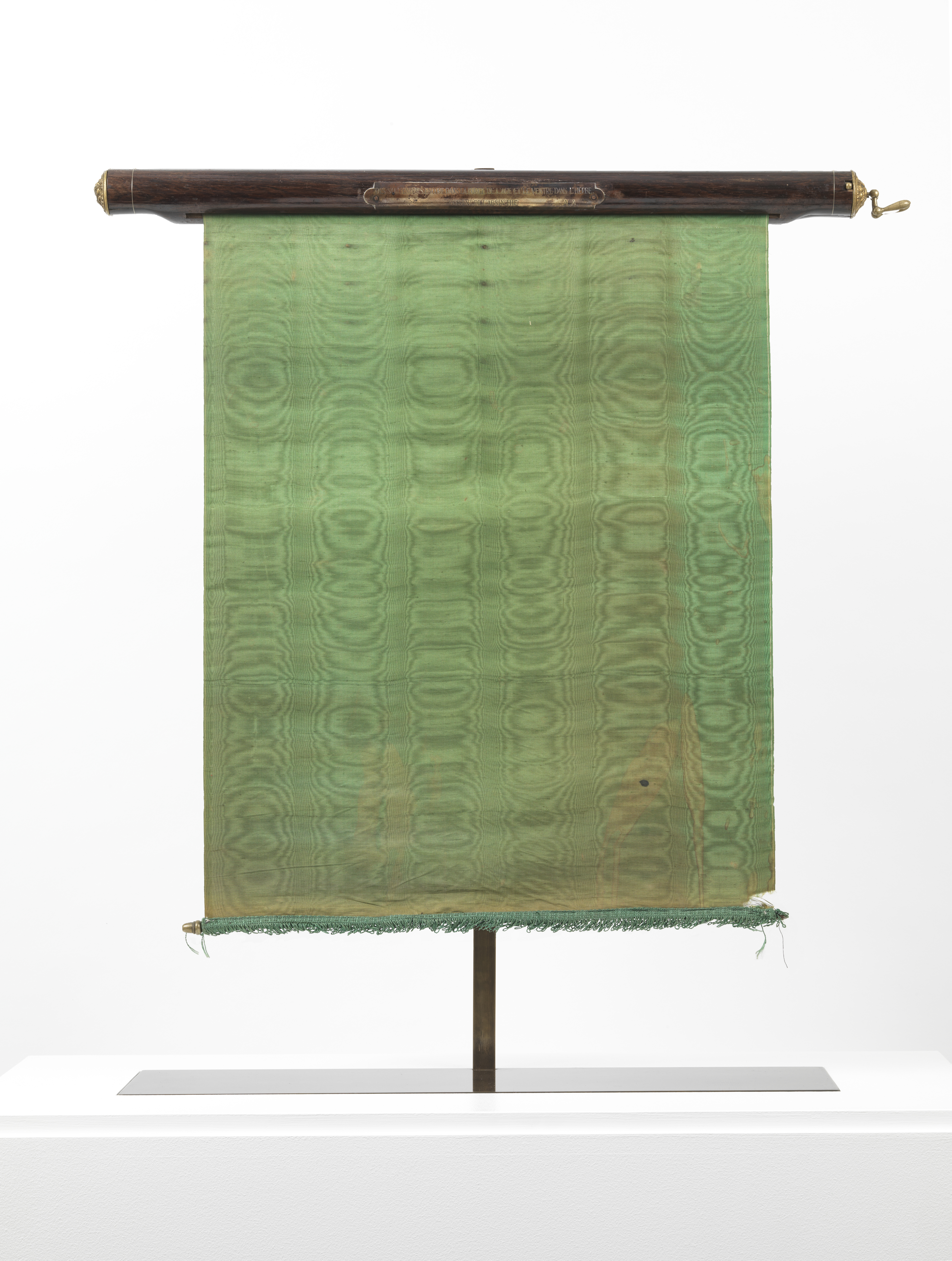
Alphonse Allais, Des souteneurs encore dans la force de l'âge et le ventre dans l'herbe boivent de l'absinthe, carriage curtain, before 1897.

One curator considers East Asian scholar's rocks to be early examples of found objects. Found and collected in natural settings, the rocks are changed only minimally for display, seldom beyond the addition of a display stand, and are meant to be contemplated as idealized representations of nature. Geological processes, chief among them erosion, give the rocks their distinctive qualities, rather than any modification by an artist or artisan.

In 2017–2018, the French expert Johann Naldi found and identified seventeen unpublished works in a private collection, classified as a national treasure on May 7, 2021, by the French Ministry of Culture, including Des souteneurs encore dans la force de l'âge et le ventre dans l'herbe by Alphonse Allais, consisting of a green carriage curtain suspended from a wooden cylinder. This work was certainly exhibited at the Incoherents exhibitions in Paris between 1883 and 1893. According to Johann Naldi, this work is the oldest known readymade and was a source of inspiration for Marcel Duchamp.

=== Duchamp's "readymades" ===
Marcel Duchamp coined the term readymade in 1915 to describe a common object that had been selected and not materially altered in any way. Duchamp assembled Bicycle Wheel in 1913 by attaching a common front wheel and fork to the seat of a common stool. This was not long after his Nude Descending a Staircase was attracting the attention of critics at the International Exhibition of Modern Art. In 1917, Fountain, a urinal signed with the pseudonym "R. Mutt", and generally attributed to Duchamp, confounded the art world. In the same year, Duchamp indicated in a letter to his sister, Suzanne Duchamp, that a female friend was centrally involved in the conception of this work. As he writes: "One of my female friends who had adopted the pseudonym Richard Mutt sent me a porcelain urinal as a sculpture." Irene Gammel argues that the piece is more in line with the scatological aesthetics of Duchamp's friend, the Baroness Elsa von Freytag-Loringhoven, than Duchamp's. The other possible, and more probable, "female friend" is Louise Norton (later Varèse), who contributed an essay to The Blind Man discussing Fountain. Norton, who recently had separated from her husband, was living at the time in an apartment owned by her parents at 110 West 88th Street in New York City, and this address is partially discernible (along with "Richard Mutt") on the paper entry ticket attached to the object, as seen in Stieglitz's photograph.

Research by Rhonda Roland Shearer indicates that Duchamp may have fabricated his found objects. Exhaustive research of mundane items like snow shovels and bottle racks in use at the time failed to reveal identical matches. The urinal, upon close inspection, is non-functional. However, there are accounts of Walter Arensberg and Joseph Stella being with Duchamp when he purchased the original Fountain at J. L. Mott Iron Works.

=== Later development ===
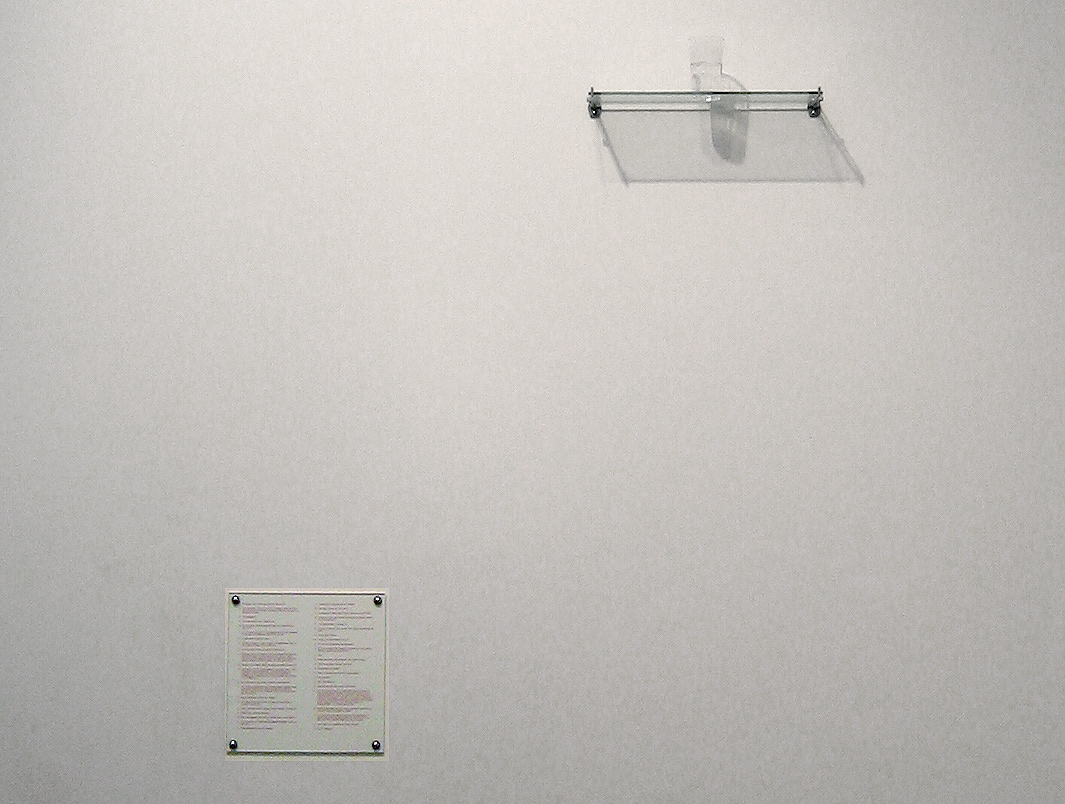
An Oak Tree by Michael Craig-Martin; 1973

The use of found objects was quickly taken up by the Dada movement, being used by Man Ray and Francis Picabia who combined it with traditional art by sticking combs onto a painting to represent hair. A well-known work by Man Ray is Gift (1921), which is an iron with nails sticking out from its flat underside, thus rendering it useless. Jose de Creeft began making large-scale assemblages in Paris, such as Picador (1925), made of scrap metal, rubber and other materials.

The combination of several found objects is a type of readymade sometimes known as an assemblage. Another such example is Marcel Duchamp's Why Not Sneeze, Rose Sélavy?, consisting of a small birdcage containing a thermometer, cuttlebone, and 151 marble cubes resembling sugar cubes.

By the time of the Surrealist Exhibition of Objects in 1936 a whole range of sub-classifications had been devised—including found objects, ready-made objects, perturbed objects, mathematical objects, natural objects, interpreted natural objects, incorporated natural objects, Oceanic objects, American objects and Surrealist objects. At this time Surrealist leader, André Breton, defined readymades as "manufactured objects raised to the dignity of works of art through the choice of the artist".

In the 1960s, found objects were present in both the Fluxus movement and in pop art. Joseph Beuys exhibited modified found objects; examples include rocks with a hole in them stuffed with fur and fat, a van with sledges trailing behind it, and a rusty girder.

In 1973, Michael Craig-Martin claimed of his work An Oak Tree, "It's not a symbol. I have changed the physical substance of the glass of water into that of an oak tree. I didn't change its appearance. The actual oak tree is physically present, but in the form of a glass of water."

== Other types of found objects ==
=== Commodity sculpture ===
In the 1980s, a variation of found objects emerged called commodity sculpture where commercially mass-produced items would be arranged in the art gallery as sculpture. The focus of this variety of sculpture was on the marketing, display of products. These artists included Jeff Koons, Haim Steinbach, and Ashley Bickerton (who later moved on to do other kinds of work).

One of Jeff Koons' early signature works was Two Ball 50/50 Tank, 1985, which consisted of two basketballs floating in water, which half-fills a glass tank.

=== Trash art ===
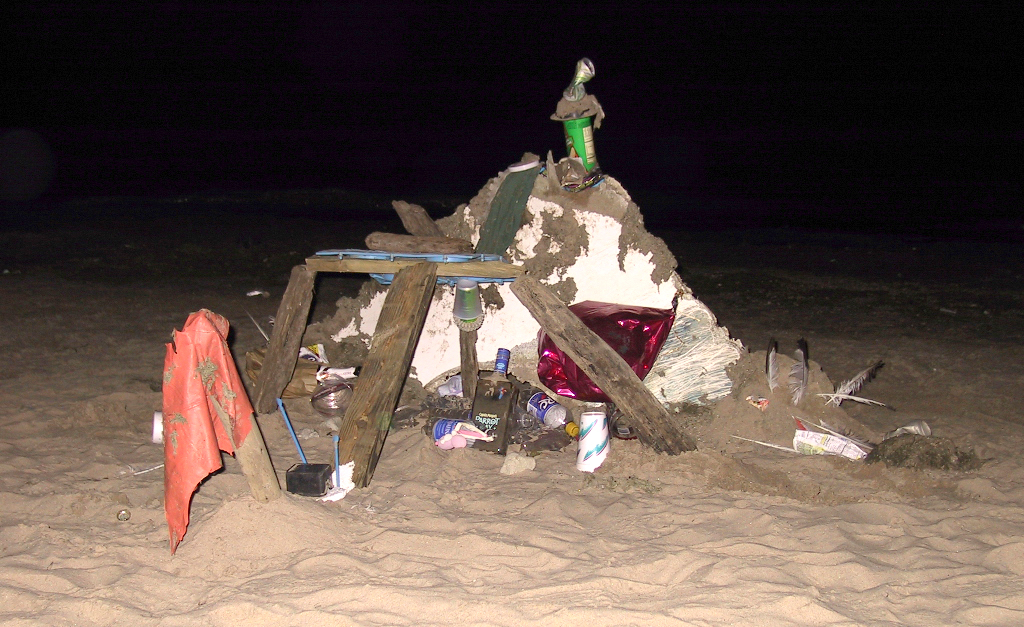
Junk art at Oak Street Beach

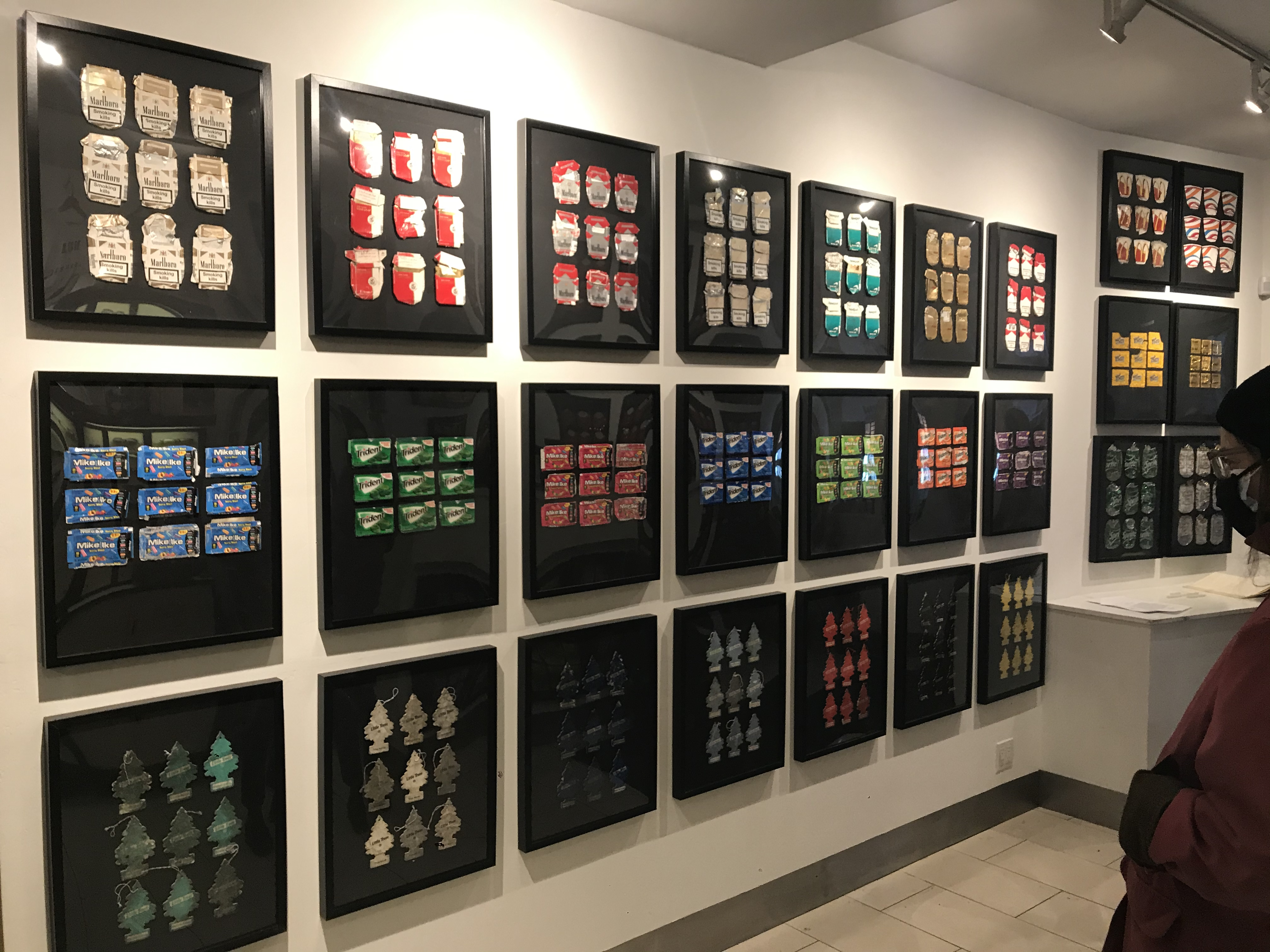
Art made from trash found on the streets of New York City by artist Bobby Puleo (2021)

A specific subgenre of found objects is known as trash art or junk art. These works primarily comprise components that have been discarded. Often they come quite literally from the trash. One example of trash art is trashion, fashion made from trash. Marina DeBris takes trash from the beach and creates dresses, vests, and other clothes. Many organizations sponsor junk art competitions. Trash art may also have a social purpose, of raising awareness of trash.

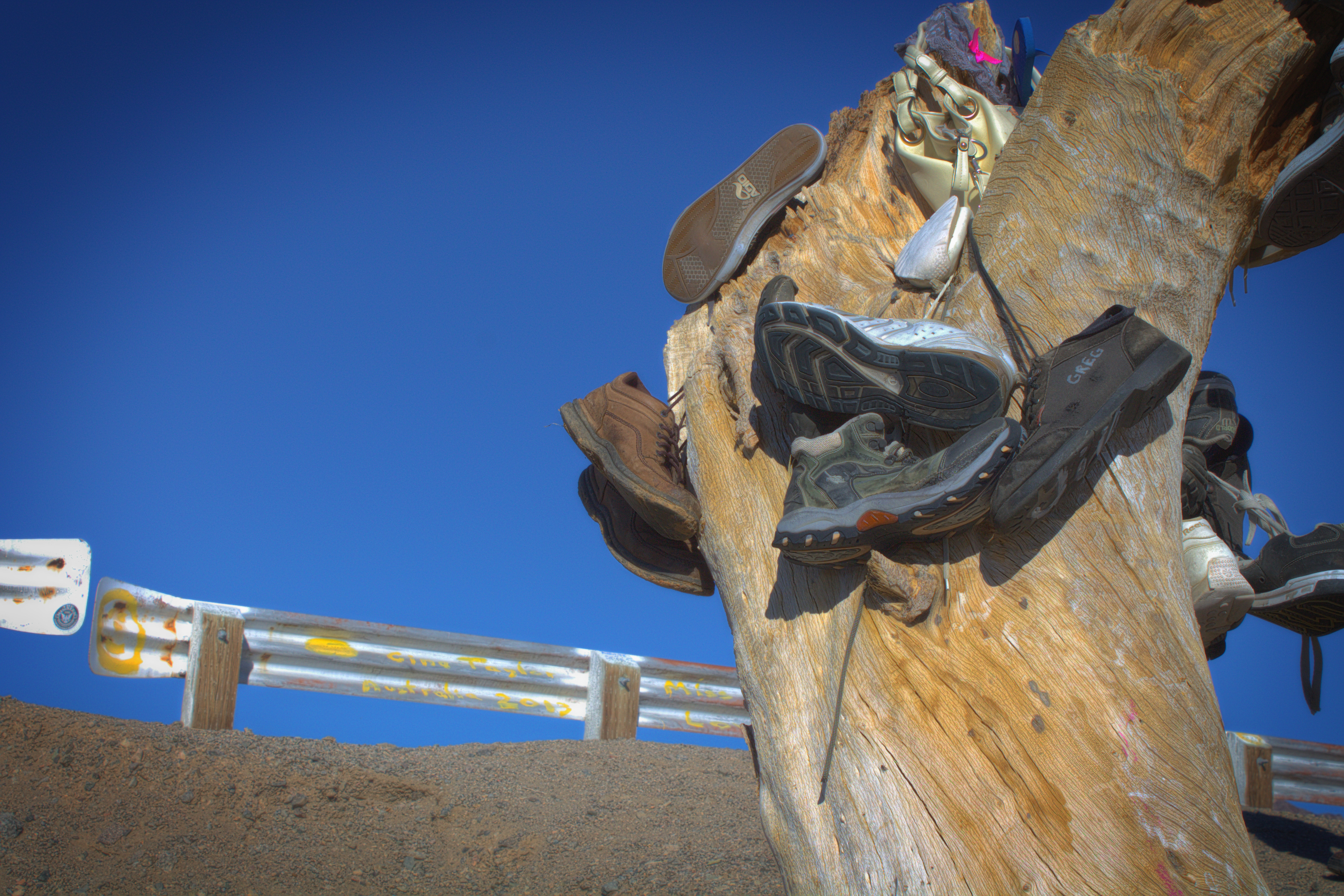
A permanent yet evolving example of junk art on Highway 66 near Amboy, California

Artists who create art from trash include:

- Spanish artist Francisco de Pajaro ("Art is trash" or "Arte es basura")
- Australian artist Paul Yore, who uses trash to create a kind of "kitsch queerness", "bad taste aesthetic", in order to challenge people's perceptions, and to examine excess consumption in society.

=== In music ===
Found objects can also be used as musical instruments. It is an important part of the musique concrète genre.

Found sounds have been used by acts including Cop Shoot Cop, Radiohead, Four Tet, The Books, and Björk. The musician Cosmo Sheldrake, who uses found sounds from the natural world in his music, has stated that incorporating the "soundscape" of ecosystems into music may be an effective means of communicating important messages about issues such as climate change.

== Criticism ==
The found object in art has been a subject of polarised debate in Britain throughout the 1990s due to the use of it by the Young British Artists. It has been rejected by the general public and journalists, and supported by public museums and art critics. In his 2000 Dimbleby lecture, Who's afraid of modern art, Sir Nicholas Serota advocated such kinds of "difficult" art, while quoting opposition such as the Daily Mail headline "For 1,000 years art has been one of our great civilising forces. Today, pickled sheep and soiled beds threaten to make barbarians of us all". A more unexpected rejection in 1999 came from artists—some of whom had previously worked with found objects—who founded the Stuckists group and issued a manifesto denouncing such work in favour of a return to painting with the statement "Ready-made art is a polemic of materialism".

== Artists ==
Many modern artists are notable for their use of found objects in their art. These include the following:

- Saâdane Afif
- Arman
- Joseph Beuys
- Guillaume Bijl
- George Brecht
- Jake and Dinos Chapman
- Greg Colson
- Joseph Cornell
- Tony Cragg
- Salvador Dalí
- Jack Daws
- Marina DeBris
- Jim Dine
- Mark Divo
- Jose de Creeft
- Marcel Duchamp
- Tracey Emin
- Tom Friedman
- Victoria Fuller
- Jim Gary
- Genco Gulan
- Louis Hirshman
- Damien Hirst
- Lonnie Holley
- Irma Hünerfauth
- Jasper Johns
- Edward and Nancy Kienholz
- Joseph Kosuth
- Igor Kopystiansky
- Svetlana Kopystiansky
- Paweł Kowalewski
- John Lefelhocz
- Sarah Lucas
- David Mach
- Michael Craig-Martin
- Rodney McMillian
- Louise Nevelson
- Nam June Paik
- Niki de Saint Phalle
- Pablo Picasso
- Robert Rauschenberg
- Man Ray
- Joe Rush
- Leo Sewell
- Daniel Spoerri
- Kurt Schwitters
- Michelle Stitzlein
- Tomoko Takahashi
- Elsa von Freytag-Loringhoven
- Wolf Vostell
- Paul Yore

== See also ==
- Altered book
- Anti-art
- Assemblage
- Appropriation (art)
- Classificatory disputes about art
- Collage
- Décollage
- Found object (music)
- Found poetry
- Found footage (disambiguation)
- Fluxus, an art movement
- Happening
- Root carving, ancient Chinese art inspired by the shape of found roots.
- Sound object
