= Footage =

Raw, unedited film or video

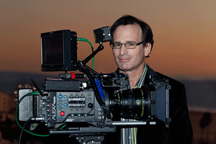
A movie camera

In filmmaking and video production, footage is raw, unedited material as originally filmed by a movie camera or recorded by a digital video camera, which typically must be edited to create a motion picture, video clip, television show, or similar completed work.

Footage can also refer to sequences used in film and video editing, such as special effects and archive material (for special cases of this, see stock footage and B roll).

Since the term originates in film, footage is only used for recorded images, such as film stock, videotapes, or digitized clips. For live television feeds, the signals from video cameras are instead called sources.

== History ==
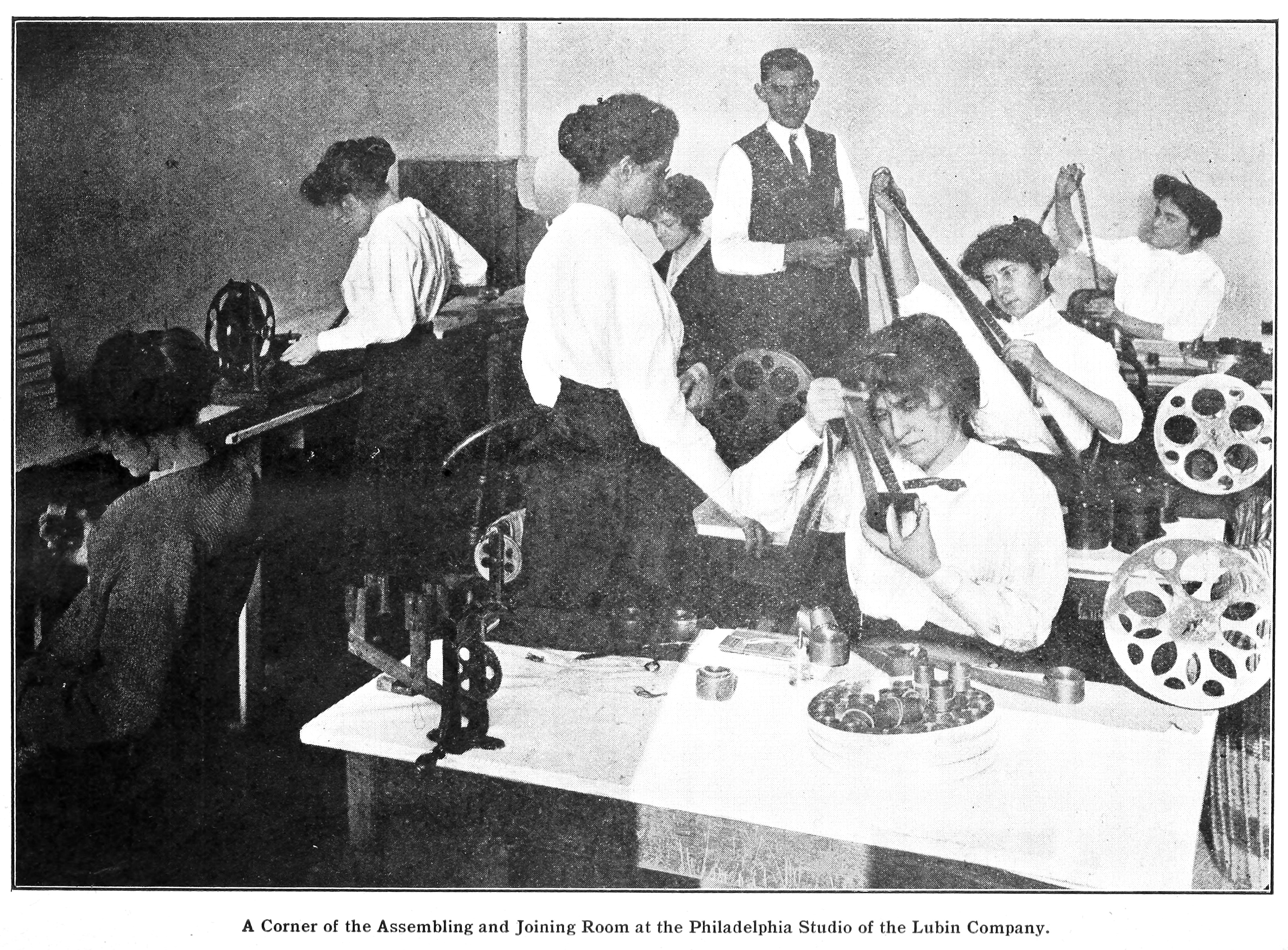
Assembling and Joining Room at the Lubin Company (1914).

The origin of the term "footage" comes from early 35 mm silent film, which is traditionally measured in feet and frames. The fact that film was measured by length in cutting rooms, and that there are 16 frames (4-perf film format) in a foot of 35 mm film (52.5 frames/meter), which roughly represented 1 second of screen time (frame rate) in some early silent films, made footage a natural unit of measure for film. The term then became used figuratively to describe moving image material of any kind.

In recent years, neutral terms such as "recorded material" are becoming more popular, especially in English-speaking countries other than the United States, although footage is still widely used.

== Types of footage ==
=== Film footage ===
Sometimes film projects will also sell or trade footage, usually second unit material not used in the final cut. For example, the end of the non-director's cut version of Blade Runner used landscape views that were originally shot for The Shining before the script was modified after shooting had finished.

=== Television footage ===
Television footage, especially news footage, is often traded between television networks, but good footage usually commands a high price. The actual sum depends on duration, age, size of intended audience, duration of licensing, and other factors.

=== Amateur video footage ===
Amateur footage is the low-budget hobbyist art of film practised for passion and enjoyment and not for business purposes. Amateur video footage of current events, for instance from camcorders, smart phones or closed-circuit television, can also often fetch a high price on the market – scenes shot inside the World Trade Center during the September 11, 2001 attacks were reportedly sold in 2001 for US$45,000 (equivalent to $80,000 in 2024).

=== Stock footage ===
Stock footage is film or video footage that can be used again in other films. Stock footage is beneficial to filmmakers as it saves shooting new material. A single piece of stock footage is called a "stock shot" or a "library shot". Stock footage may have appeared in previous productions but may also be outtakes or footage shot for previous productions and not used. Examples of stock footage that might be utilized are moving images of cities and landmarks, wildlife in their natural environments, and historical footage. Suppliers of stock footage may be either rights managed or royalty-free. Many websites offer direct downloads of clips in various formats.

== Footage broker ==
A footage broker is an agent who deals in footage by promoting it to footage purchasers or producers, while taking a profit in the sales transaction.

== See also ==
- B roll
- Film gauge
- Found footage (disambiguation)
- Stock footage
