= Michelle Stitzlein =

American artist

- Born: United States
- Education: Columbus College of Art and Design, BFA, Columbus, OH, 1989
- Known for: Found object art, – Variety of Media

Michelle Stitzlein is an American artist who creates found object art / sculpture from recycled materials. She received a BFA in 1989 from the Columbus College of Art and Design (in Columbus, Ohio). She and her husband Nathaniel Stitzlein (also an artist) founded Art Grange Studios in Baltimore, Ohio. At Art Grange they share their love of art with the public by offering tours of the studios as well as art workshops for all ages.

== Elevating the Unimpressive ==
Stitzlein's assemblages of mostly discarded materials propels the viewer to reassess that which is often overlooked. "As an artist and as a person, I ask myself to look closer, lest I miss the one exquisite trait in something oftentimes regarded as distasteful, old, tired, unimpressive or just plain ugly so that I may see it again with fresh eyes."

Kurt Shaw writes, "If, as the Jungian psychoanalyst and poet Clarissa Pinkola Estes would have us believe, butterflies are "Soul Birds," then Stitzlein sets the mind free to wonder not what junk is, but what it can be. "

== Moth series ==
Combining an artistic boldness with the premise that recycled materials have the capacity to metamorphose into larger objects of beauty, Stitzlein's series of more than 14 wall hung sculptures moths range in size from 3 to 11 feet.

She began working on this series in 2003, inspired by "myriad varieties of beautiful, exotic moths in my own backyard."

The pieces are constructed from recycled materials such as old piano keys, tin cans, license plates, and bicycle tires.

== Bottle cap art ==
Michelle Stitzlein offers workshops, demonstrations and lectures about creating sculpture from plastic bottle caps and other recycled materials. Each event is catered specifically to the needs of the venue and occasion.

She has also written a book outlining projects for children, families, schools and non-profits utilizing recycled, plastic bottle caps.

== Awards ==
Michelle Stitzlein was awarded a 2023-2024 individual grant from the Pollock-Krasner Foundation.
