= Root carving =

Traditional Chinese art form

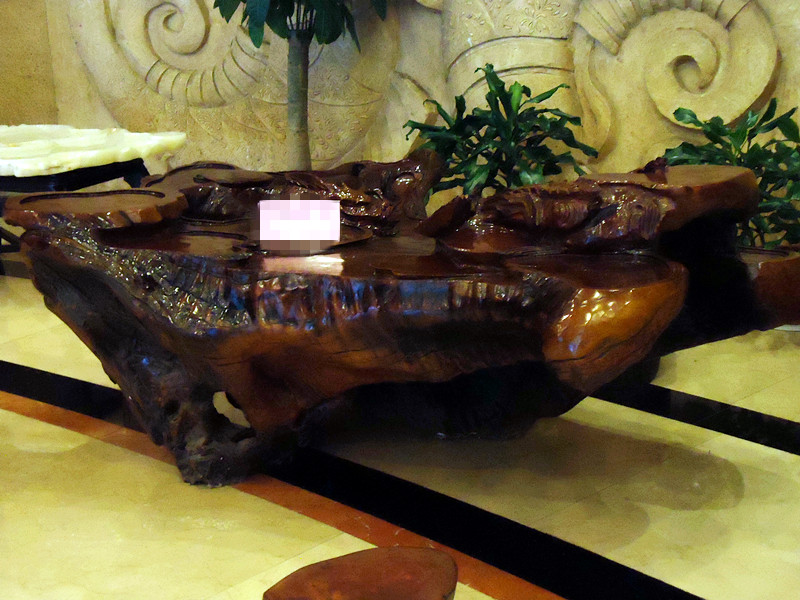
A Chinese tea table carved from tree roots. Note the flat "terraces." Each drains tea into a waste reservoir under the table.

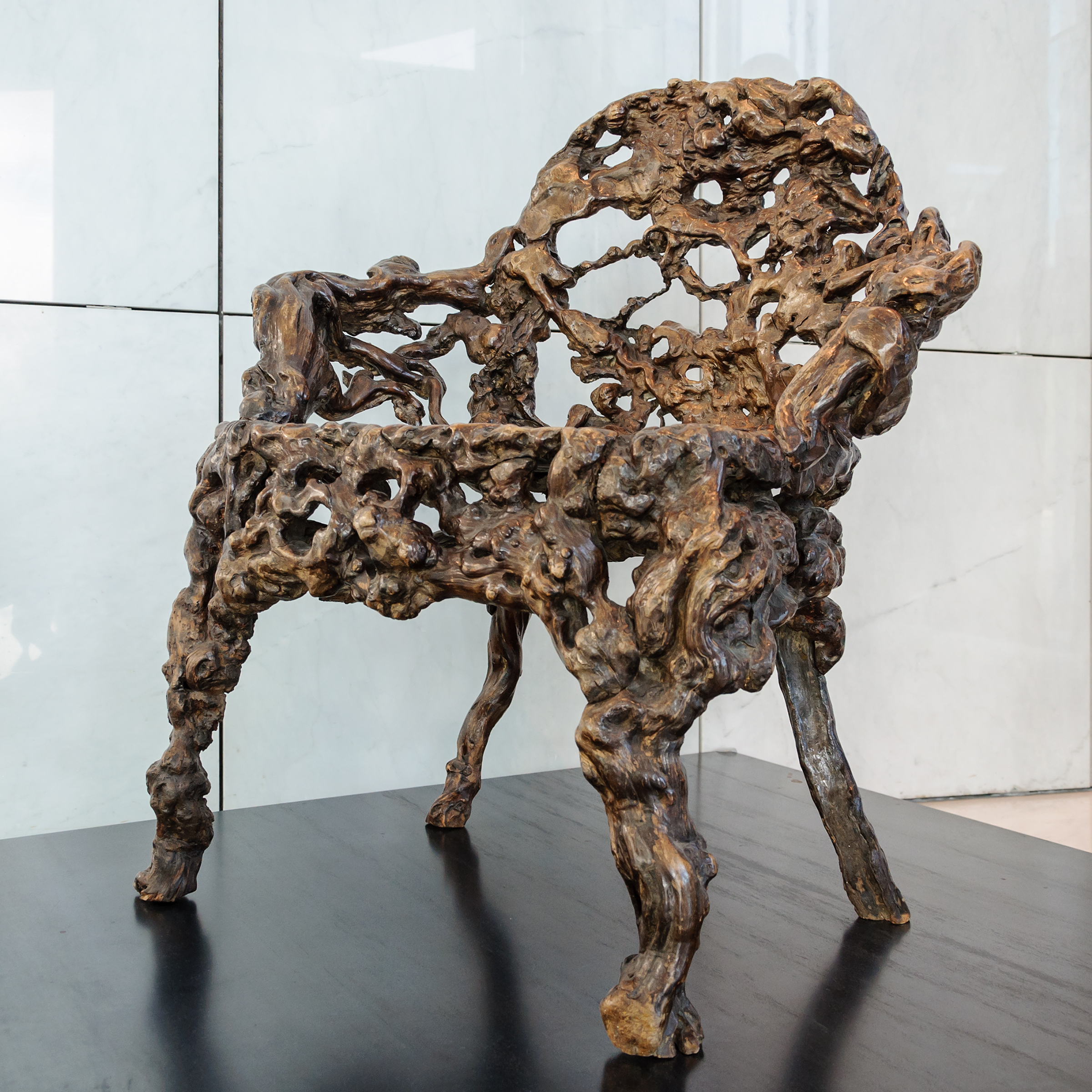
Chinese armchair made from roots. Qing Dynasty, Qianlong era, 18th century

Root carving is a traditional Chinese art form that involves carving and polishing tree roots into various artistic creations.

== History ==
Root carving has been practiced for centuries. Like many other artistic crafts, root carvings were initially created using primitive techniques. The earliest root carvings are “辟邪” and “角形器” from the Warring States period.

In the Sui and Tang dynasties, root carving prevailed among the general public and the governing class. In the Tang dynasty, people emphasized the natural forms of roots, cleverly taking advantage of the effect of corroded and moth-eaten material.

Root carvings were also typical in grottoes and temples during the Song and Yuan dynasties. Roots were used to carve Buddha statues, which contrasted favorably with clay.

== Features ==
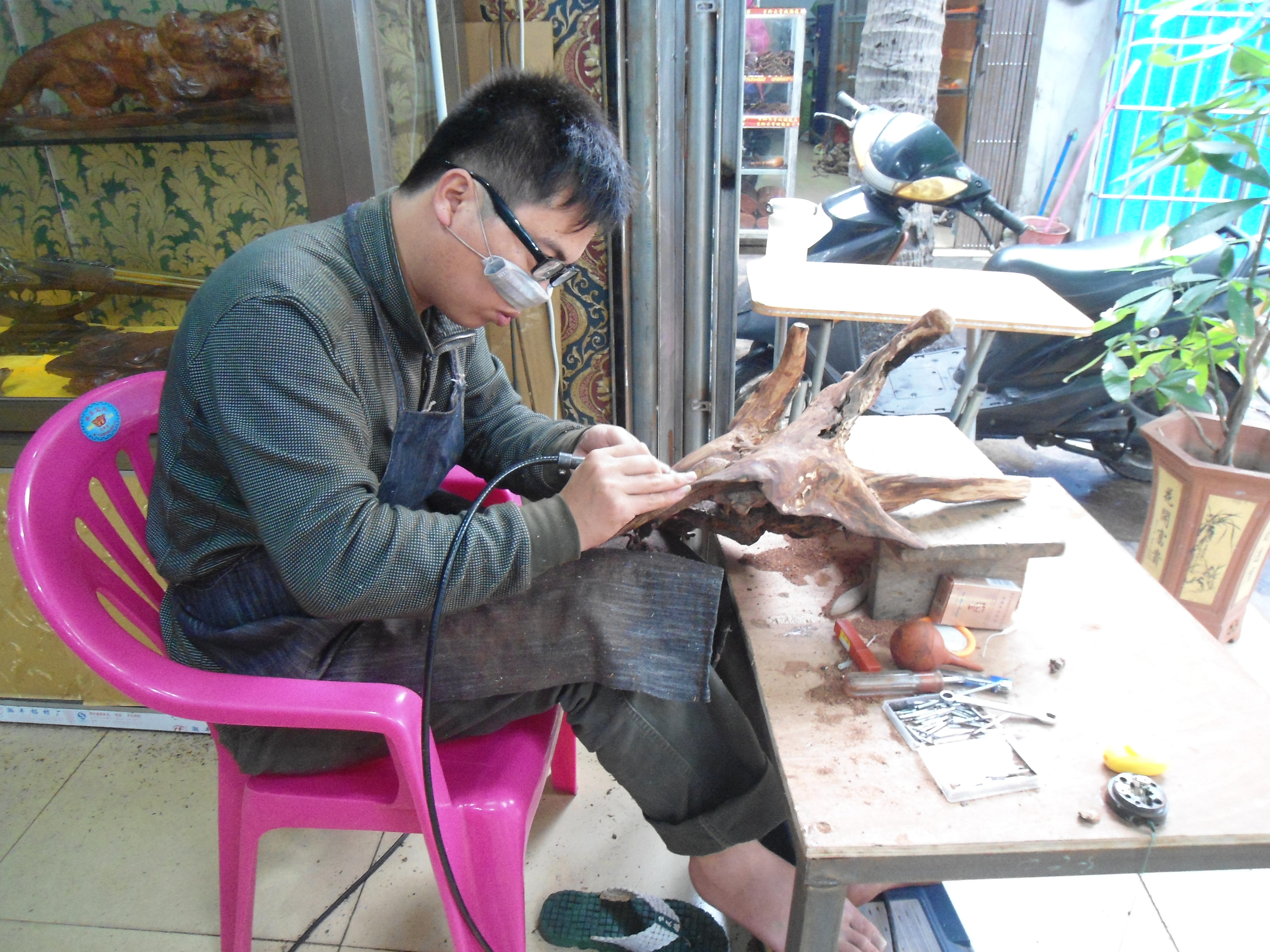
A craftsman works on a piece in Haikou City, Hainan Province. His shop is located beside East Lake, part of Haikou People's Park. The area contains dozens of small shops dedicated to root carvings.

Root carving preserves the natural beauty of roots, allowing artists—both ancient and modern—to create vivid, lifelike works by emphasizing the roots' natural forms. Carvings may be of artistic or practical value, with subjects ranging from depictions of mythological stories to coffee tables.

Root carving is distinct from engraving. Although its aesthetic principles share common ground with engraving, root carving uniquely applies their shared expressive techniques. Root carving and engraving share expressive techniques with wood carving, sculpture, and stone carving. However, root carving places a focus on enhancing and preserving the natural shape of the roots, in addition to artificial polishing. Root carving is guided by the inherent qualities of the root rather than by strictly carving images.
