= Paweł Kowalewski =

Polish artist (born 1958)

- Born: 20 September 1958 (age 68); Warsaw
- Education: Academy of Fine Arts in Warsaw
- Notable work: "I, shot dead by the Indians", "Mon Cheri Bolscheviq", "Zdzisiek jumps every night with a bottle of petrol", "Totalitarianism Simulator", "Europeans Only",
- Style: painting, installation
- Movement: Transavanguardia, Gruppa, Postconceptualism
- Website: https://pawelkowalewski.pl/en/

Paweł Kowalewski – (born 20 September 1958 in Warsaw) is a Polish artist, member of Gruppa collective, academic teacher, founder of the Communication Unlimited agency.

== Biography ==
From 1978 to 1983 he studied at the Academy of Fine Arts in Warsaw, where he received a diploma with distinction from the studio of Stefan Gierowski. Since 1985 he has been a lecturer at the Department of Design of the Warsaw Academy of Fine Arts. Currently he holds the academic title of professor of the Academy. He was a founder member of Gruppa, the most famous artistic grouping in Poland in the 1980s, together with Ryszard Grzyb, Jarosław Modzelewski, Włodzimierz Pawlak, Marek Sobczyk and Ryszard Woźniak. Gruppa's works can be summarised as being a rebellion against an overly academic approach to art and a taking of a post avantgarde position, as well as being a protest against the censorship and repression meted out by the communist state during the time of martial law which had been introduced in 1981 throughout Poland.

The reality of this difficult period in the history of the People's Republic of Poland (PRL) was felt by Kowalewski primarily in terms of the absurd and grotesque. From 1984 to 1989, in Gruppa's short-lived journal "Oj dobrze już (Oh, It's Good Now)" among verses, commentaries, sketches and drawings, Kowalewski wrote humorous texts using the pseudonym of an imaginary American journalist Sharm Yarn. He wanted in this way to show up the lack of confidence in traditional Polish art criticism, comment on the lack of engagement with the unique phenomena which were happening in Poland during this time as well as make fun of attempts to set forced directions for culture based on political paradigms set from above.

=== Creative output ===
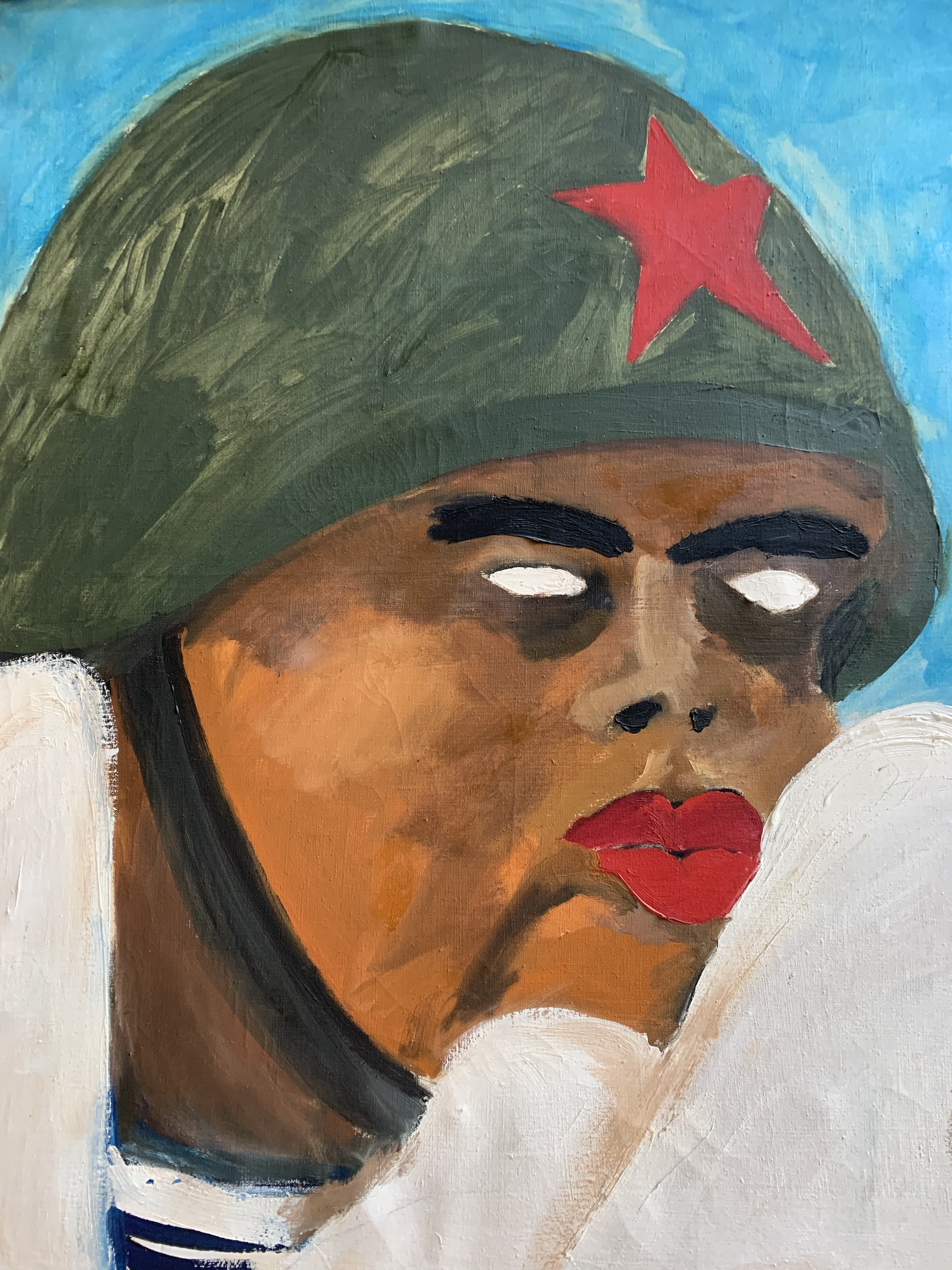
Paweł Kowalewski, "Mon Cheri Bolscheviq", 1984, oil on canvas, 100 x 81 cm, in the collection of the Starak Family Foundation

Kowalewski's work comes from the post conceptual tradition, where the idea of the artist mixes with his work using the form of written commentaries and the poetic often complex titles of the works which are placed on sashes made of material. Together with the other members of Gruppa, he organised radical happenings with joint painting and recitals, based on poetic absurdity, in, among other places the cult studio "Dziekanka" at the Warsaw Academy of Fine Arts (e.g. recital in 1987," A Cold Deer in Jam" about Lenin in Poronin. Kowalewski's art can be described as being expressionist, autobiographical, inspired by personal experience and literary context. As an artist he created his own communicative language. More important than form or medium for him was the message.

In Poland during the 1980s there was a characteristic meeting of social and artistic paths, which were taken by artists who were researching that reality while examining moral and ideological values. The work of Kowalewski and Gruppa was created in parallel with and perhaps even earlier than some of the trends which were then happening in German art, such as Neue Wilde. Rebellion and a search for identity determined the approach of artists then in both countries.

=== Concept of personal art ===
From the first years of his artistic career Paweł Kowalewski developed the concept of "personal art, that is private". Artistic inspiration therefore was closely connected to the artist's own life, while also at the same time it also referred to problems which were of a more universal nature. This basic oscillation between the individual experience and universality has accompanied Kowalewski's work up till today and reflects a consistent theme.

Around 1986 the first of Kowalewski's sculptures came into being. Small objects, which the artist closed in glass cases, as if they were relicts from the past. "Prawe ucho sługi najwyższego Kapłana/The Right Ear Serves the Highiest Priest" and "Kamień, który stał się chlebem/The Stone which Became Bread" were critical commentaries on the hostile everyday aesthetic of the time. In a similarly brutal, expressive and nonchalant tone Kowalewski created his paintings which were even the subject of censorship interventions from the Catholic Church. The artist's work in the 1980s was treated by the authorities of what was then a totalitarian state as art which must stay outside official circulation. The series "Psalmy/Psalms" which was inspired by the Psalm of David as translated by Czesław Miłosz, was subjectively accused of blasphemy. Each of these works by Kowalewski referred to specific quotations from this book of psalms and reflected the dilemmas of a young artist: Should I leave or stay in my country? What is right? Is there justice...?

The crowning moment of this period was the artist's participation in Documenta 8. in Kassel in 1987, where works by among others Barbara Kruger and Joseph Beuys were exhibited. Kowalewski together with Gruppa organised a joint painting happening on a large size canvas called, "Kuda Gierman".

After many exhibitions both nationally and abroad some of Kowalewski's works became in later times icons of 1980s art, e.g. "Mon Cheri Bolsheviq" (a painting exhibited in among other places the Tretyakov Gallery in Moscow), the sculpture "Tragiczna nieprzezroczystość konieczności/A Tragic Opaque Necessity" (a hermetically sealed aquarium with a piece of beef kidney submerged in water) or "Do widzenia moi kochani/Goodbye, My Beloved Ones" (a painting which is part of the private collection of the well-regarded art critic Anda Rottenberg).

=== Breakthrough time ===
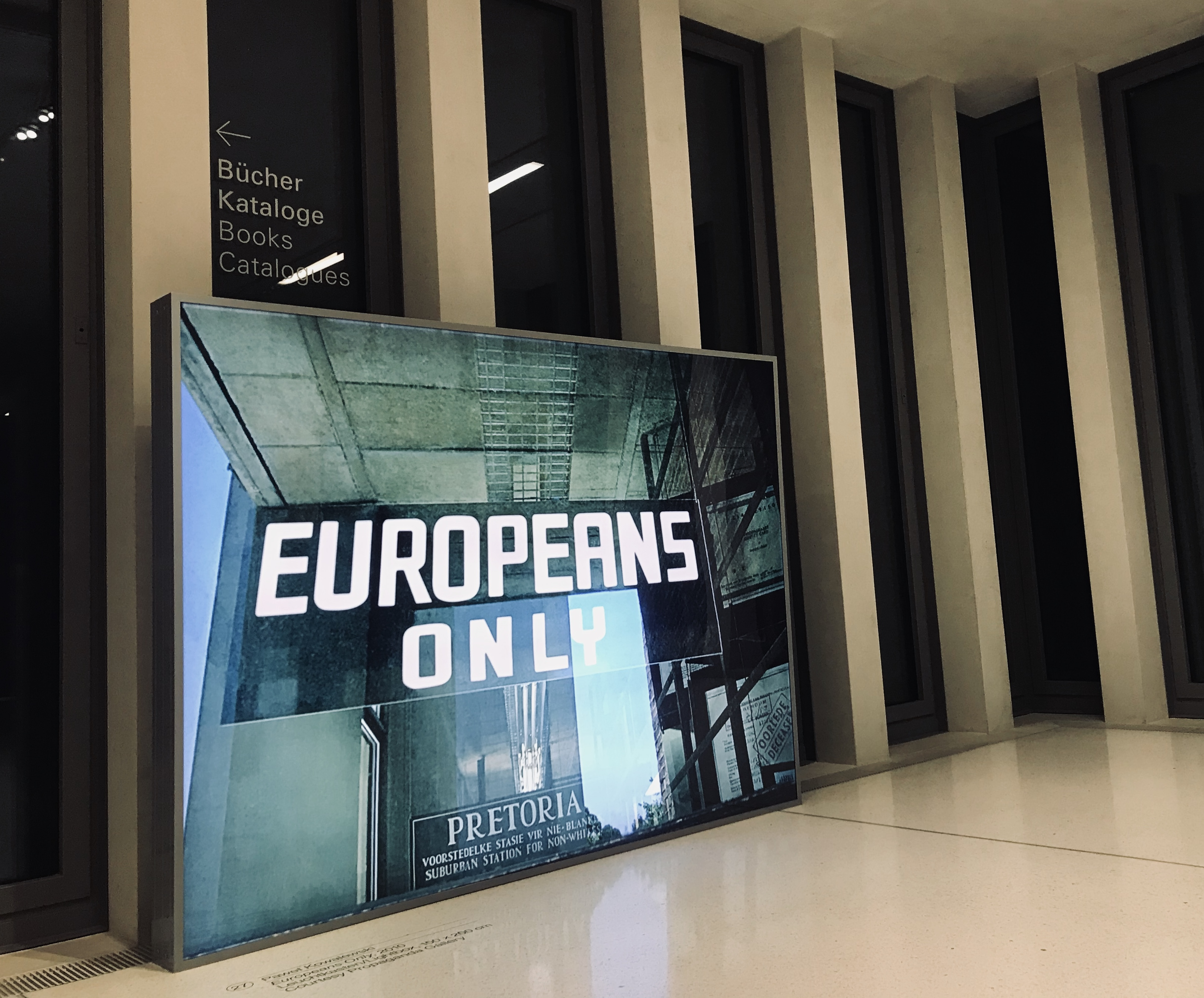
Paweł Kowalewski, "Europeans Only", from the cycle Forbidden, 2012, lightbox, 150 × 200 × 12 cm, exhibition in NS-Dokumentationszentrum in Munich, Germany

A key transformative moment in Kowalewski's work came in 1989, when the artist together with other members of Gruppa initiated a joint painting gathering in front of the capital city's Solidarity polling station. This gathering called "Głos przyrody na Solidarność" as known as "Voice of Nature on Solidarity" was a symbolic closing moment of the group's career. The artists had started in the 1980s as novices, and had finished the decade as classics. Thanks to their many artistic successes, in 1992 in the Zachęta National Art Gallery there was a large retrospective exhibition, which showed a significant cross-section of Gruppa's work. The country's systemic transformation and also the end of the Gruppa's existence, affected Kowalewski's work by changing its means of communication. At the beginning of the 90s he started to create analytical and structural canvasses. In his paintings from this period the artist's work portrayed a clash of nineteenth century wall paper patterns with black and white stripes – a sarcastic vision of the future. After exhibiting his latest series called „Fin de siècle" in the Warsaw gallery Appendix in 1992, Paweł Kowalewski was taken on by the French gallery of Isy Brachot, as the only Pole apart from Roman Opałka. His work was then shown in the Brachot gallery in Brussels, together with a retrospective of one of Belgium's most famous artists, the surrealist Paul Delvaux. Kowalewski concluded his artistic work in the medium of painting with the „Fin de siècle" series. From this moment he concentrated on inter-disciplinary and performance art. During this period the artist created his most characteristically socially engaged work as an artist. The sign "Europeans Only", seen in the Apartheid Museum in Johannesburg in 2010 initiated the series "Forbidden/NIE WOLNO" which took the form of a documentation of all the bans and orders which the artist registered during his travels all over the world. Reproductions of the "NIE WOLNO" series in the form of postcards appeared during Kowalewski's artistic performances during the Biennale in Venice in 2011. The artist visited souvenir stands and added his cards with the regulatory orders of both democratic and totalitarian systems to the standard tourist ones which were normally displayed. "NIE WOLNO" also functioned as a series of light boxes which accompanied the installation "Totalitarianism Simulator" in Propaganda Gallery in 2012. In this technical machine built by the artist, the world of oppression and drastic images of the crimes committed during totalitarian times, were presented next to scenes from a normal everyday life (e.g. barman competition in Italy, a family out for a walk in Milan, a classical music concert). The viewer on entering the simulator became a participant in the tragic events, because his photo which was registered on entry to the cabin, was randomly placed on the projected filmed frames of horror. The materials used to produce the "Totalitarianism Simulator", the smell of rubber, smelly tar, the darkness and isolation, brought the viewer closer to a situation associated with oppression, so that each individual could become aware of his reactions and behaviour during the simulation of a moment of danger.

=== New beginning ===
The 2000s for Kowalewski brought a turn towards the ethos of memory or the personal process of forgetting and erasing. In 2015 in Tel Aviv the artist presented the series "Strength and Beauty" in which he concentrated on issues connected to subjective memory in the context of group experience.

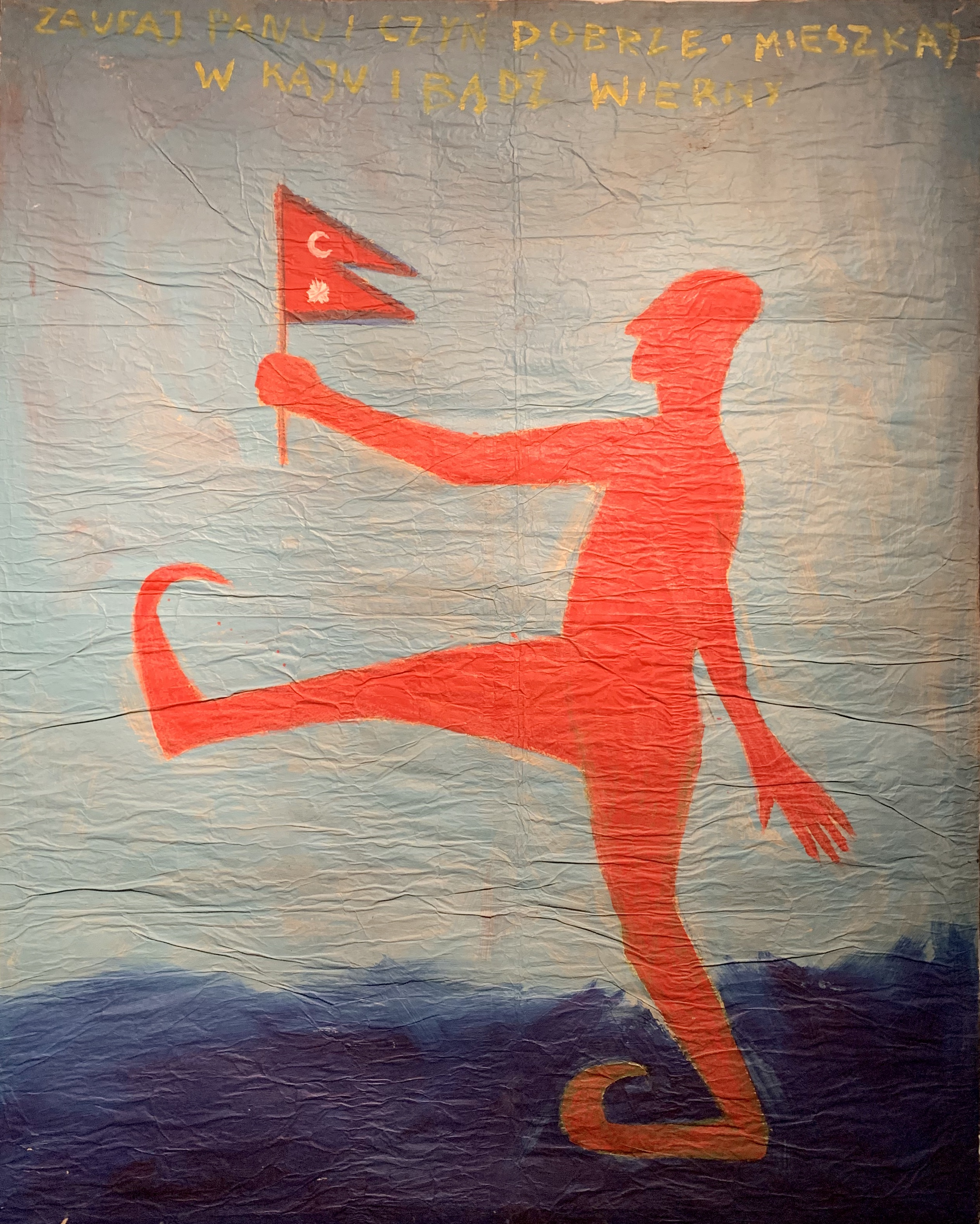
Paweł Kowalewski, "Trust the Lord and Do Good, so Shalt Thou Dwell in the Land Feed on His Faithfulness", from the cycle Psalms, 1984, tempera on paper, 243 x 195 cm

The concept was inspired by a very personal history of the artist and became a pretext to tell the stories of an extraordinary generation of women. A series of large format portraits which disappeared, presented so called "Polish Mothers" who had been affected by the trauma of war and totalitarianism. Thanks to a special printing technique, the women's portraits after some time were barely visible, just as their images fade in our memories. Kowalewski while working on the series "Strength and Beauty" conduced an artistic dialogue with the well-known Israeli artist Dan Reisinger. In 2017 Paweł Kowalewski had his own solo exhibition in the prestigious Jerke Museum, the first foreign institution in Germany which is mainly dedicated to Polish avant-garde art. The "Zeitgeist" project was made up of sculptures and the best-known paintings from the 1980s, among others "Ja zastrzelony przez Indian/I, Shot Dead by the Indians". As a part of the exhibition, at the same time in St. Peter's Church in Recklinghausen, Kowalewski's large format works were exhibited, so the Psalms of David, which even today have retained their universal character, as they deal with issues related to how to shape individual autonomy when faced with higher powers. He also stars in the movie "Power of Art" realized by the Jerke Museum and the Film School in Łódź.

=== Collections and exhibitions ===
Paweł Kowalewski's works are to be found in the biggest Polish museums, but also in the Paris Centre Pompidou, as well as many Polish and foreign private collections. His work has been bought for the National Museum of Warsaw collection, the National Museum of Kraków, Zachęta – National Art Gallery, Museum Jerke, the Regional Museum in Bydgoszcz, the Museum of Upper Silesia in Bytom, the collection of the Academy of Fine Arts in Warsaw, and also the ING Polish Art Foundation, the Benetton Foundation, the Starak Family Foundation and the Egit Foundation. They are also to be found in the private collections of Andrzej Bonarski, Donald Pirie, Cartier, Jan Zylber and the Paszkowski Estate Norblin.

Paweł Kowalewski's work has also been exhibited in among other places the Jerke Museum in Germany, Artist's House in Tel Aviv, the Tretyakov Gallery in Moscow, the Isy Brachot gallery in Brussels, in Dorotheum in Vienna, Sotheby's in London, NS-Dokumentationszentrum in Munich, Zachęta – National Art Gallery in Warsaw, the Museum of the History of Photography in Kraków, MOCAK, the Warsaw Gallery Propaganda (formerly Appendix) as well as at art fairs in Vienna, Brussels and Stockholm.

The artist has also taken part in important retrospective exhibitions summarising the time of the Polish transformation and political relations in Poland up to and after 1989, e.g. "Banana Revolution", "Moscow – Warsaw", "Irreligion" and "The Fatherland in Art".

=== Auction market ===
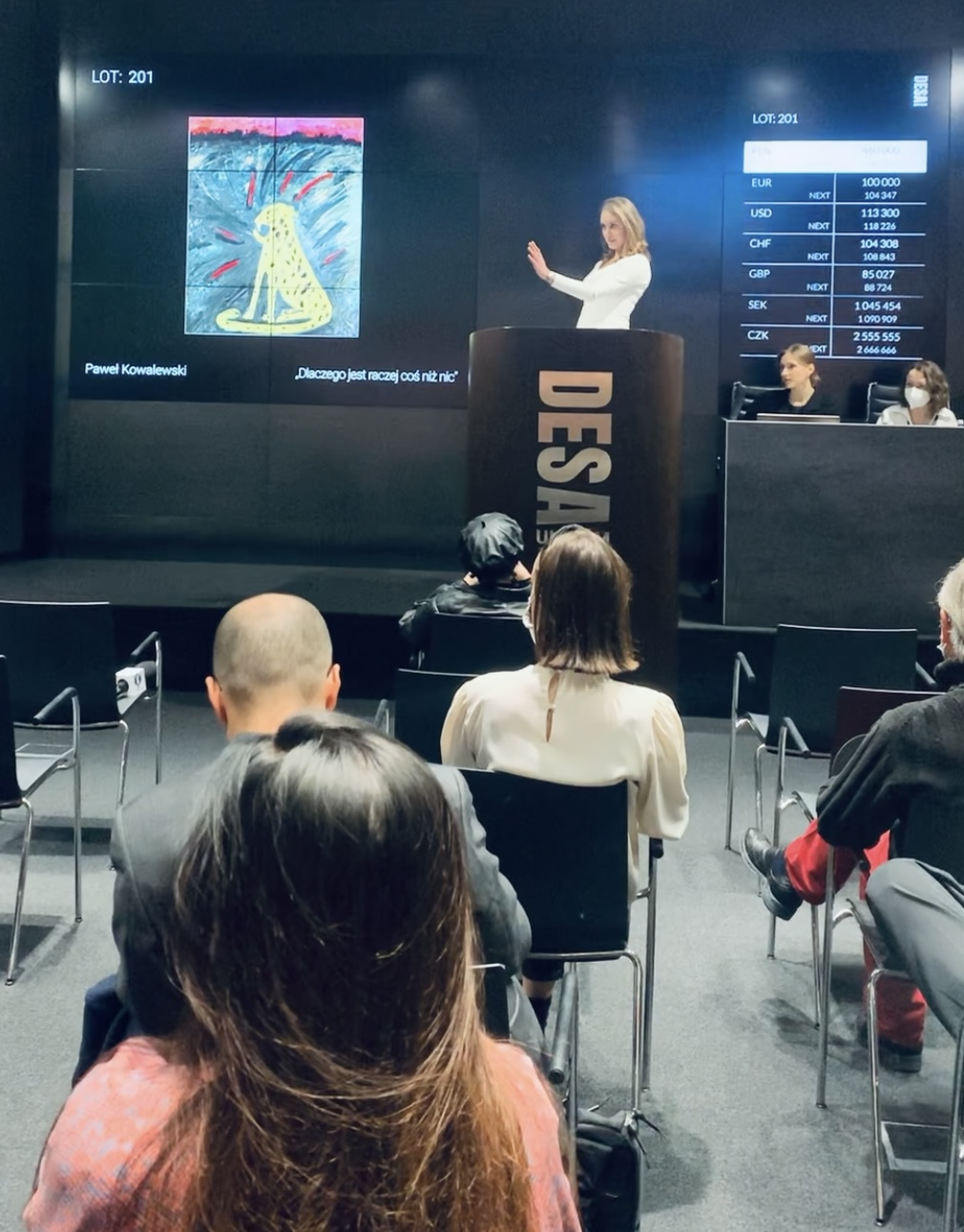
Live art auction of Paweł Kowalewski's NFT "Why is There Something Rather than Nothing?" at the DESA Unicum auction house in Warsaw, on 2 December 2021.

The painting by Paweł Kowalewski "Why is There Something Rather than Nothing?" from 1986, it was the first NFT object to be sold at a Polish live art auction. The pioneering event for the domestic art market, took place on 2 December 2021 at DESA Unicum. The artist's work that has been tragically damaged, now passes to eternity in a digital form.

=== Professional life ===
In 1991 he set up his own advertising agency "Communication Unlimited".

== Solo exhibitions ==
- 1984 – Woe Betide, A. M. Sobczyk Atelier, Warsaw
- 1984 – Bad Omen, Mała Galeria ZPAF, Warsaw
- 1984 – Mad Hammer, Dziekanka Atelier, Warsaw
- 1986 – Satan's Day, Gallery "Na Ostrowie", Wrocław
- 1987 – Recital, Dziekanka Atelier, Warsaw
- 1987 – STK, Łódź
- 1987 – Mandala Theatre, Cracow
- 1989 – Paweł Sosnowski Gallery, Warsaw
- 1990 – Everything & At Once, SARP Pavilion, Warsaw
- 1990 – Ariadne Galleries, Vienna
- 1991 – Paintings and Ready Mades, Polish Cultural Centre, Prague
- 1991–92 – Turn of the Century, Gallery Appendix, Warsaw
- 1992 – Office of Art Exhibitions, Sandomierz
- 1992 – Isy Brachot Gallery, Brussels
- 1993 – Stockholm Art Fair
- 1993 – Brussels Art Fair
- 2008 – I, Shot Dead by the Indians for the Second Time, Gallery Appendix2, Warsaw
- 2010 – NOT ALLOWED!, 2. Mediations Biennale, Poznań
- 2012 – Totalitarianism Simulator, Gallery Propaganda, Warsaw
- 2013 – Totalitarianism Simulator, MCSW Elektrownia, Radom
- 2015 – Strength and Beauty, The Artists House, Tel Aviv
- 2016 – These Things Now, Gallery Propaganda, Warsaw
- 2017 – Strength and Beauty, Museum of Photography, Cracow
- 2017 – Zeitgeist, Museum Jerke, Recklinghausen
- 2017 – Why is There Nothing rather Than Something?, Miejski Ośrodek Sztuki, Gorzów Wielkopolski
- 2019 – All Life is Art, Przestrzeń dla Sztuki S2, Warsaw
- 2021 – Objects Created to Stimulate the Life of the Mind; The Invisible Eye of the Soul, Gallery of Contemporary Art WINDA, Kielce
- 2023 –Totalitarianism Simulator, the Museum of Photography in Kraków
- 2024 – STÄRKE UND SCHÖNHEIT/STRENGTH AND BEAUTY, Polnisches Institut Berlin, Berlin
- 2024 – Failure of Reason, Mazovian Centre for Contemporary Art “Elektrownia”, Radom

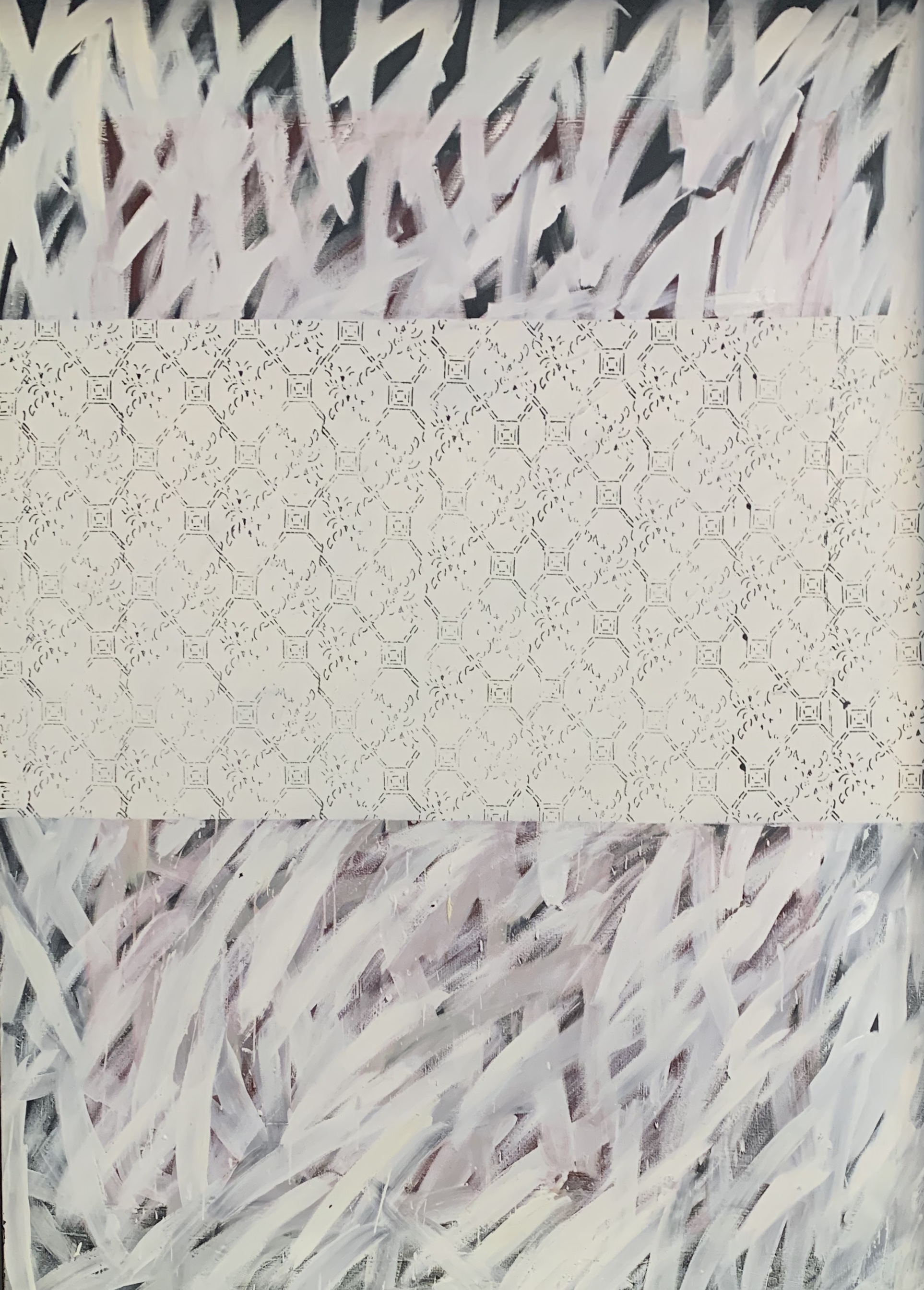
Paweł Kowalewski, "We Live in Motion, We Rest in Death", 1991, oil on canvas, 180 x 131 cm

== Group exhibitions ==
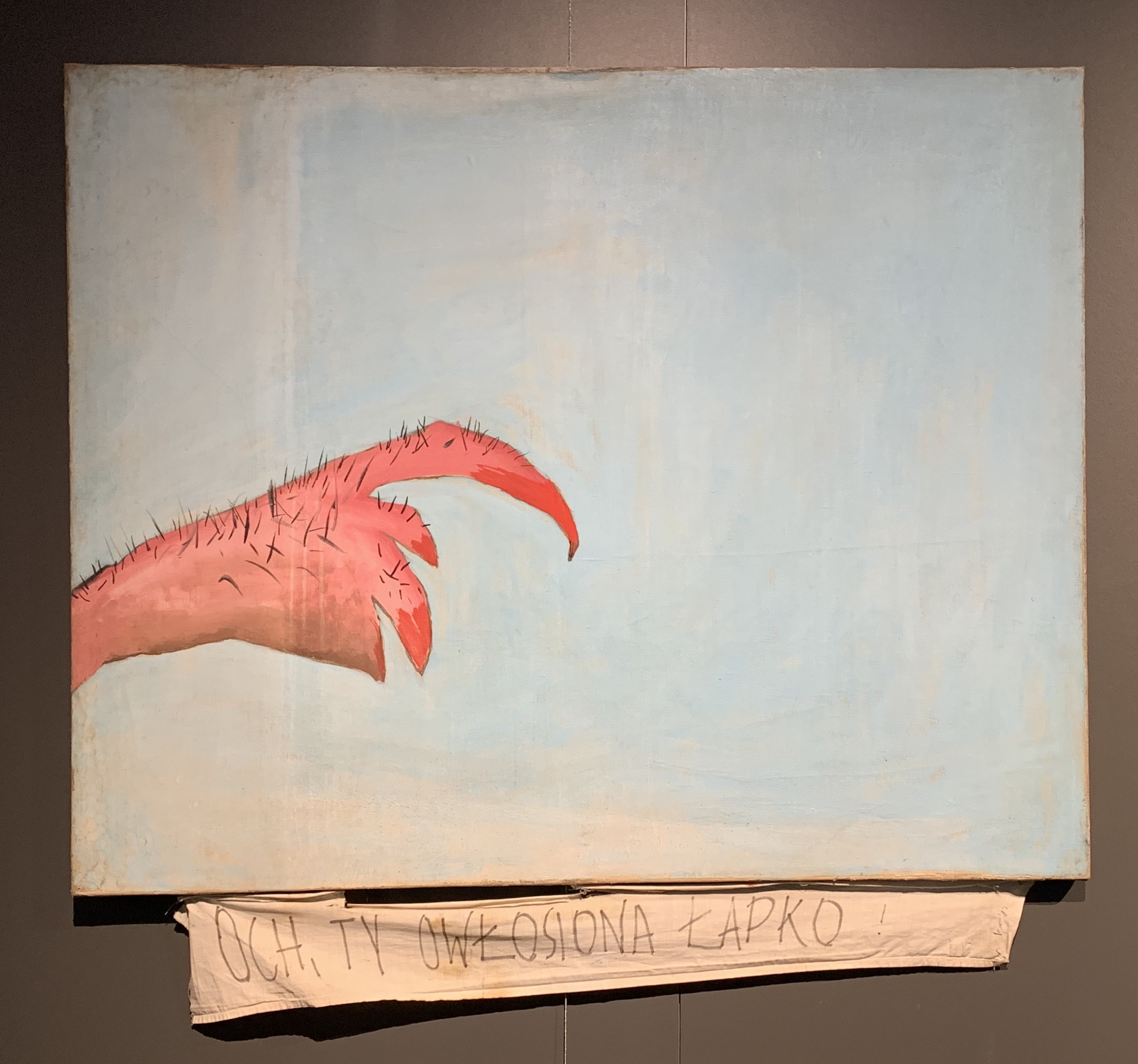
Paweł Kowalewski, "Oh, You Hairy Paw!", 1982, oil on canvas, 80 x 100 cm

- 1984 – Chaos, Man, Absolute, Church of the Visitation of the Blessed Virgin Mary, Warsaw
- 1985 – Brought to Account, Gallery Forma, Warsaw
- 1985 – Against Evil, against Violence, churches: Mistrzejowice, Podkowa Leśna, Zielonka
- 1985 – Presence, Parish of Divine Mercy, Warsaw
- 1985 – 1st Biennale Road and Truth, Holy Cross Church, Wrocław
- 1985 – Time of Sadness, Time of Hope, Church of Our Lady of Sorrows, Poznań
- 1985 – 1st Biennale of New Art, Zielona Góra
- 1986 – Records 2, Office of Art Exhibitions, Lublin
- 1986 – Expression of the 80s., Office of Art Exhibitions, Sopot
- 1986 – Polish Pieta, churches: Poznań, Wrocław
- 1986 – Testimony of Togetherness, Museum of the Warsaw Archdiocese, Warsaw
- 1987 – Mystery of the Passion, Death and Resurrection of Jesus Christ, Museum of the Warsaw Archdiocese, Warsaw
- 1987 – 2nd Biennale Road & Truth, Church of the Holy Cross, Wrocław
- 1987 – What's Up?, Former Norblin Factory, Warsaw
- 1988 – In the image and Likeness. New Religious Expression, Former Norblin Factory, Warsaw
- 1989 – Feelings, Gallery Dziekanka, Warsaw
- 1989 – Pole. German. Russian., Former Norblin Factory, Warsaw
- 1990 – 1990 – Artists for the Republic, Gallery Studio, Warsaw
- 1990 – Summer Salon, National Museum, Cracow
- 1990 – Kunst des 20 jahrhunderts aus Mittel und Osteuropa, Dorotheum, Vienna
- 1991 – Sketch for the Contemporary Art Gallery, National Museum, Warsaw
- 1991 – What Good is an Artist in Times of Misery, Zachęta National Gallery of Art, Warsaw; National Museum, Cracow
- 1991 – Artistic Confrontations, Old Town Hall, Toruń
- 2001 – Run of the Reds, Gallery Zderzak, Cracow
- 2002 – Irreligion, Atelier 340 Museum, Brussels, Belgium
- 2003 – Children, Artists, Harlots and Businessmen, Gallery Program, Warsaw
- 2003 – Obligation and Revolt. The Academy of Fine Arts in Warsaw 1944–2004, Zachęta National Gallery of Art, Warsaw
- 2004/05 – Warsaw – Moscow/ Moscow – Warsaw 1900–2000, Zachęta National Gallery of Art, Warsaw; Tretyakov State Gallery, Moscow.
- 2006 – In Poland, Meaning Where?, Centre for Contemporary Art, Warsaw
- 2007 – Humour and the Power to Think (Asteism in Poland), Centre for Contemporary Art, Warsaw; Łaźnia Centre for Contemporary Art, Gdańsk
- 2007 – Image of Life, Museum of the Origins of the Polish State, Gniezno
- 2007 – Poisoned Source. Contemporary Polish Art in the Post-romantic Landscape, National Museum, Szczecin; Latvian National Arts Museum.
- 2008 – Banana Republic. Expression of the 80s., Office of Art Exhibitions Wałbrzych; National Museum, Szczecin; Gallery Wozownia, Toruń; City Gallery Arsenał, Poznań; Łaźnia Centre for Contemporary Art, Gdańsk
- 2009 – Like a Rolling Stone, Centre of Polish Sculpture, Orońsko; (Like a Rolling Stone 2) Gallery Appendix2, Warsaw
- 2009–10 – Banana Republic. Expression of the 80s., MODEM Centre for Modern and Contemporary Arts, Debrecen
- 2010 – 18. battle which Changed the Fate of the World, Pavilion at the Parade Square, Warsaw
- 2010–11 – Generation 1980. Independent Works of the Young in the Years 1980–1989, National Museum, Cracow
- 2011 – Big Boys Games, Gallery Appendix2, Warsaw
- 2011 – Preview, Gallery Propaganda, Warsaw
- 2013 – Blue The Most Beautiful Colour in the World, Gallery Propaganda, Warsaw
- 2013 – Small is Big, Gallery Propaganda, Warsaw
- 2014 – Between Seasons, Gallery Propaganda, Warsaw
- 2016 – Collections, Zachęta – National Art Gallery, Warsaw
- 2016 – À la Flamande, Propaganda, Warsaw
- 2016 – Viennacontemporary, Marx-Halle, Vienna
- 2018 – Place of the Artist Kordegarda Gallery of the National Center for Culture, Warsaw
- 2018 – Homeland in Art, 'MOCAK' Museum of Contemporary Art, Cracow
- 2019 – Collections, Zachęta – National Art Gallery and Centre of Polish Sculpture in Orońsko, National Forum of Music, Wrocław
- 2019 – Magmatism Pic-Nic, Chiesa dei Santi Cosma e Damiano, Venice, Italy
- 2019 – Time, Gdańska Galeria Miejska, Gdańsk, Poland
- 2019 – New Figuration- New Expression, DESA Unicum, Warsaw, Poland
- 2019 – My Name is Red, Państwowa Galeria Sztuki, Sopot, Poland
- 2019 – Tropical Craze, Propaganda, Warsaw Gallery Weekend, Warsaw, Poland
- 2019 – II World War – Drama, Symbol, Trauma, Museum of Modern Art, Cracow, Poland
- 2019 – Tell Me about Yesterday Tomorrow, Munich Documentation Centre for the History of National Socialism, Munich, Germany
- 2019 – Antimonuments, Józef Brandt's Palace, Center of Polish Sculpture, Orońsko
- 2019 – The Spirit of Nature and Other Fairy Tales. 20 years of the ING Polish Art Foundation, Silesian Museum, Katowice
- 2021 – Sculpture in a Search of a Place - Zachęta – National Gallery of Art, Warsaw
- 2021 – A.B.O. THEATRON. L’Arte o la Vita / Art or Life – Achille Bonito Oliva, Castello di Rivoli Museo d’Arte Contemporanea, Turin
- 2021 – *** TOWARDS FREEDOM. Polish Art of the 1980s. and 1990s. from the Collection of Werner Jerke, Państwowa Galeria Sztuki, Sopot
- 2021 – Us and Dogs, Dogs and Us, Państwowa Galeria Sztuki, Sopot
- 2022 – Exercises from Art. Collection of the Museum of the Academy of Fine Arts in Warsaw, Czapski Palace, Warsaw
- 2022 – Politics in Art, MOCAK Museum of Contemporary Art, Kraków, Poland
- 2022 – Tectonic Movements. On the artistic symptoms of the Transition, Museum of Art in Łódź MS1, Łódź
- 2023 – Materializing. Contemporary Art and the Shoah in Poland, NS-Dokumentationszentrum, Munich
- 2024 – New Expression, CENTRE OF CONTEMPORARY ART ZNAKI CZASU, Toruń
- 2024 – Food in Art, MOCAK Museum of Contemporary Art, Kraków, Poland

== Exhibitions and events by Gruppa ==
- 1983 – Forest, Hill and Cloud above the Hill, Dziekanka Atelier, Warsaw; Office of Art Exhibitions, Lublin
- 1984 – Premier's Mother, Chamber Theatre, Warsaw
- 1984 – A Woman Running off with Butter, Dziekanka Atelier, Warsaw
- 1985 – Lifting the Curtain on the Secrets of Traditional Painter's Atelier, Dziekanka Atelier, Warsaw (1st event)
- 1985 – Art of Admiration, Gallery SHS, Warsaw
- 1985 – How to Help Kryszkowski?, Strych, Łódź
- 1985 – Only Tonight Darling, Office of Art Exhibitions, Lublin
- 1985 – Rypajamawłoszard Grzykomopasoźniak Wkład w wykład vel Idź wylicz, Dziekanka Atelier, Warsaw (2nd event)
- 1985 – Who Can See This Radius Vector?, Gallery Wieża, Warsaw
- 1985 – Gold of the Economy, Incense of Art, Bitter Myrrh of Politics, Parish of Divine Mercy, Warsaw
- 1985 – Song and Dance Ensemble of the Polish People's Republic, Dziekanka Atelier, Warsaw (3rd event)
- 1986 – You Rabble, Boredom which Brings Bad Luck is Your Hero, Gallery Wielka 19, Poznań
- 1986 – Sluggish Youth Sings, Stuffy Maid Whirls, Dziekanka Atelier, Warsaw (4th event)
- 1987 – Gruppa Gruppen, Gallery Atrium, Stockholm
- 1987 – Avanguardia polacca esposizione dell'arte indipendente polacca, Centro Direzionale Colleoni, Agrate Brianza near Milan
- 1987 – Kuda Gierman, Gruppenkunswerke, Kassel
- 1988 – The Drawing on Site, Gallery Obraz, Poznań
- 1988 – Artist in a Temple of Words About Art, Gallery "Na Ostrowie", Wrocław
- 1988 – They Interfere Animals with Spitting Out Objects Taken into Their Snouts, Gallery DESA „Nowy Świat", Warsaw
- 1988 – Cathedral of Painting, Gallery Dziekanka, Warsaw (5th event)
- 1988 – Ars Aura Prior, Gallery DESA „Stary Rynek", Poznań
- 1988 – Gruppa – Documents, Gallery Pokaz, Warsaw
- 1989 – The Dungeons of Manhattan, Łódź
- 1989 – Woyzeck. (Shacks? We've Got Our Own), Studio Theatre, Łódź
- 1991 – Gruppa – 6 Good Mistakes, Dziekanka Atelier, Warsaw
- 1992 – Gruppa 1982–1991, Zachęta National Gallery of Art, Warsaw
- 2002 – We Confess Guilt, Ask for Forgiveness and Promise Improvement, Program Art Gallery, Warsaw
- 2013 – Oh, It's All Right Now, Gallery Propaganda, Warsaw
