= Found footage =

Found Footage or found footage may refer to:

- Found footage (appropriation), the use in a film of footage previously made for another purpose
  - Collage film, a film assembled entirely from found footage
- Found footage (film technique), a style of film fiction which simulates the use of found footage
- Found Footage 3D, an American found footage horror film
- Found Footage Festival, an American film festival and live comedy event
- "Found Footage" (Wonder Man), an episode of Wonder Man
- "The Backrooms (Found Footage)", "Found Footage #2", or "Found Footage #3", episodes of the web series Backrooms
