= Pumpkin festival =

A pumpkin festival is a type of annual festival celebrating the autumn harvest of pumpkins. They are typically celebrated around October in the Northern Hemisphere.

"Pumpkin festival" may refer to:

== Republic of Ireland ==
- Virginia Pumpkin Festival at Virginia, County Caven

== United States ==
- Barnesville Pumpkin Festival, at Barnesville, Ohio
- Circleville Pumpkin Show, at Circleville, Ohio
- Half Moon Bay Art and Pumpkin Festival, at Half Moon Bay, California
- Morton Pumpkin Festival, at Morton, Illinois
- New Hampshire Pumpkin Festival, at Laconia, New Hampshire (previously the Keene Pumpkin Festival at Keene, New Hampshire)
- West Virginia Pumpkin Festival, at Milton, West Virginia
