= Barnesville Historic District =

Historic district in Ohio, United States

- U.S. National Register of Historic Places
- U.S. Historic district
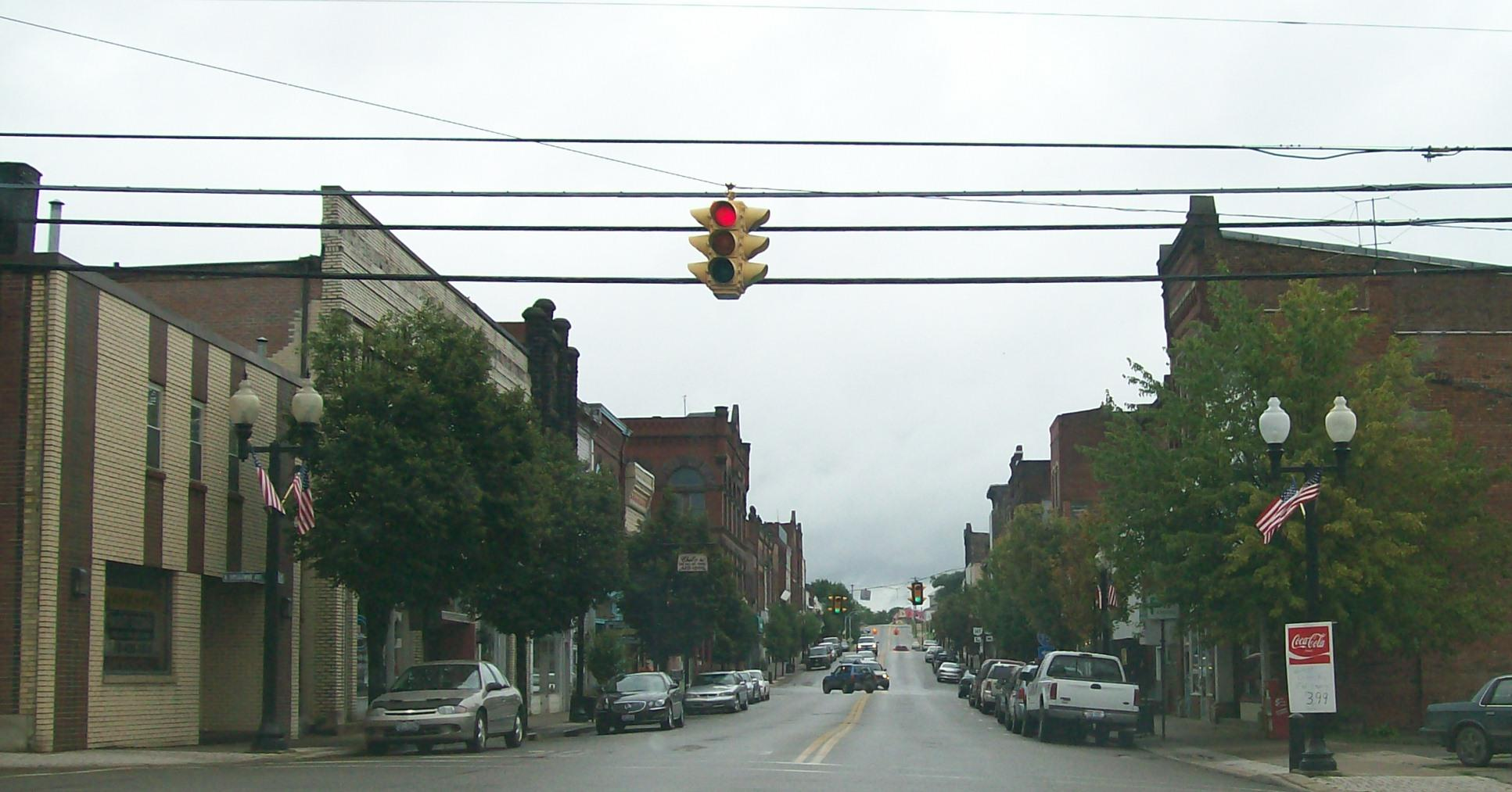
- View east of downtown Barnesville, Ohio.

- Location within Ohio Location within the United States
- Location: Roughly bounded by Arch, Main, Gardner, Chestnut, Bond and Cherry Sts., Barnesville, Ohio
- Coordinates: 39°59′40″N 81°10′38″W
- Area: 40 acres (16 ha)
- Built: Various times
- Architect: Multiple
- Architectural style: Late 19th and 20th century revivals, Greek Revival, Late Victorian
- NRHP reference No.: 84002899
- Added to NRHP: July 19, 1984

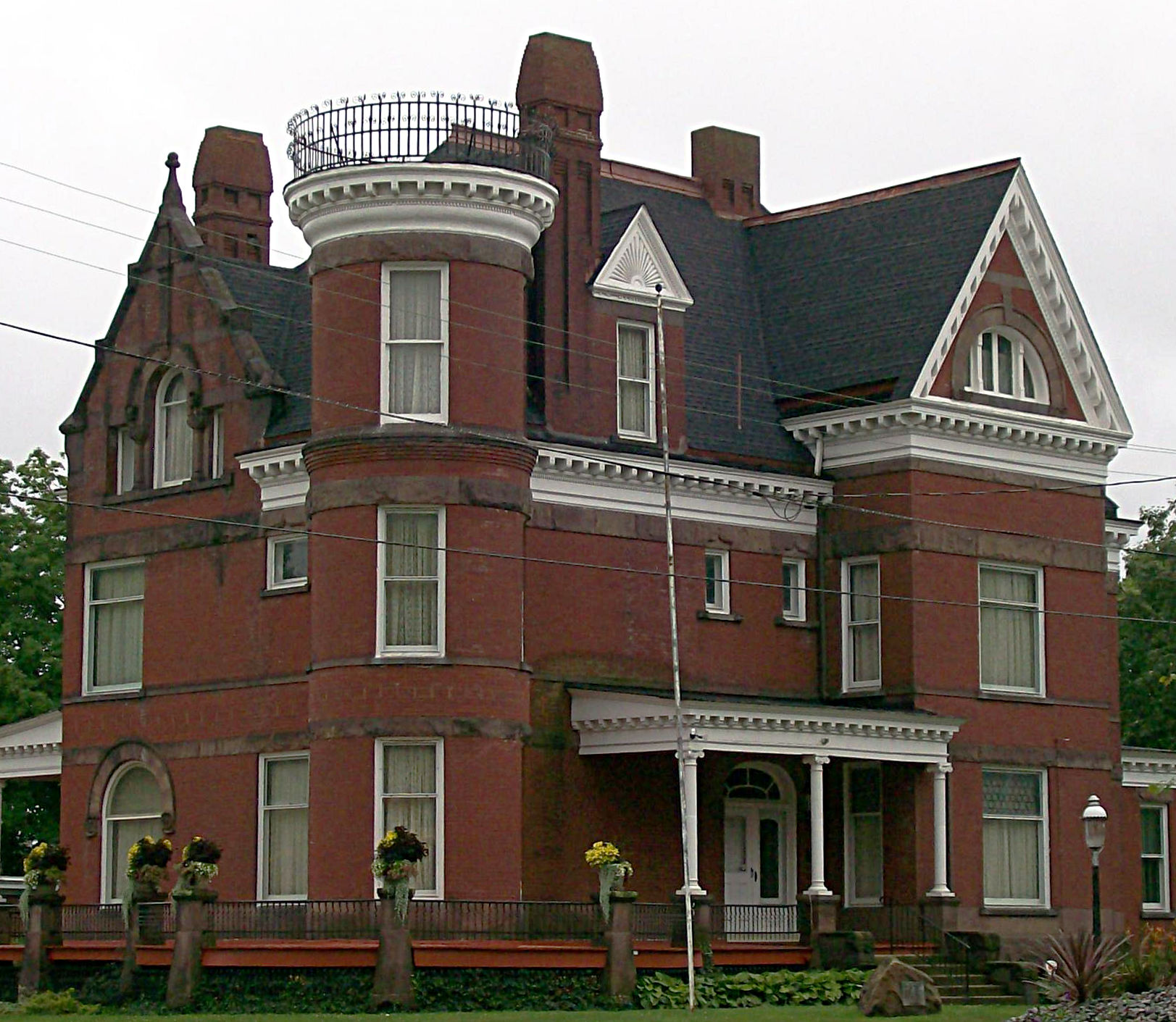
The Belmont County Victorian Mansion Museum.

The Barnesville Historic District consists of the oldest part of Barnesville, Ohio, originally platted in 1808 and contains roughly 40 acres and 180 buildings. The district was added to the National Register on July 19, 1984.

== History ==
=== Founding and growth: 1800–1860 ===
The area around Barnesville was settled by pioneer families, mostly Quaker, around the early 19th century. These early settlers arrived in the area after leaving Maryland, Pennsylvania and the southern states. A meeting house was built and cemetery was established to the east of the future site of Barnesville. This early settlement attracted the attention of a certain Maryland farmer.

Barnesville was first "laid out" in 1808 by James Barnes, who had travelled to the area hoping to create a new Quaker settlement in a rural setting. He found rolling landscape along a Drovers' road ideal for a site and soon platted out lots and roads for his new town. Barnes was not alone in this venture as his brother, David, also made the trek out in hopes to find a better place for his family. The Barnes brothers owned much land and had a hand in the development of the village, owning a tannery, a brick yard, mills, and several farming and crop lands.

James soon left to return to Maryland, but his brother stayed as mayor of the developing town and took up residence on Main Street. Much of the architectural heritage from this period is lost to the current Victorian buildings. During the mid-to-late 19th century, more settlers, tired of the cramped eastern seaboard, migrated to places like Barnesville. A railroad was placed through the town in 1857, leading to what would be Barnesville's population boom.

=== Expansion to industrialization: 1860–1950 ===
The railway brought with it industrialization and population growth. Watt Car and Wheel Company, The Eastern Ohio Glass Company, Hanlon Paper Company and the Barnesville Glass Company are some of the many manufacturing companies which moved into Barnesville during this time. The original plat was expanded to the north and south to accommodate the influx of residents. The town kept growing at a rate that the B&O Railroad built the town a much needed depot in 1916, which is also listed on the National Register.

It was during this time period that many of the current buildings were constructed, lending Barnesville a unique post-Civil War architectural theme. Many of the numerous churches were also built reflecting the variety of religious sectors that helped Barnesville grow (the town currently boasts 12 different churches within its limits).

The town particularly saw a growth during the World Wars, as the needs of the country turned to militarization. The Watt Car and Wheel Company increased production to keep up with the demand for coal, and also turned to manufacturing other wheel and accessory components for vehicles. The Glass Company also increased production for vehicles and ships during the war economy. When peace was finally declared after World War II, none in the town realized that it would begin a declining trend in the community.

=== Decline to stabilization: 1950–present ===
The armistice of the Korean War finally signalled an end to the war-time production demanded during the 1940s and many communities suffered as a result. Barnesville soon saw many businesses close their doors during the next few decades. As redevelopment emerged in the late 1960s to early 1970s, many building from this period were erased from existence. The large warehouses were soon replaced with houses and smaller businesses.

The town began to recover from this setback during the late 1980s and early 1990s. The town's historical integrity has been fairly maintained leading to a sense of pride in the community.

== The district today ==
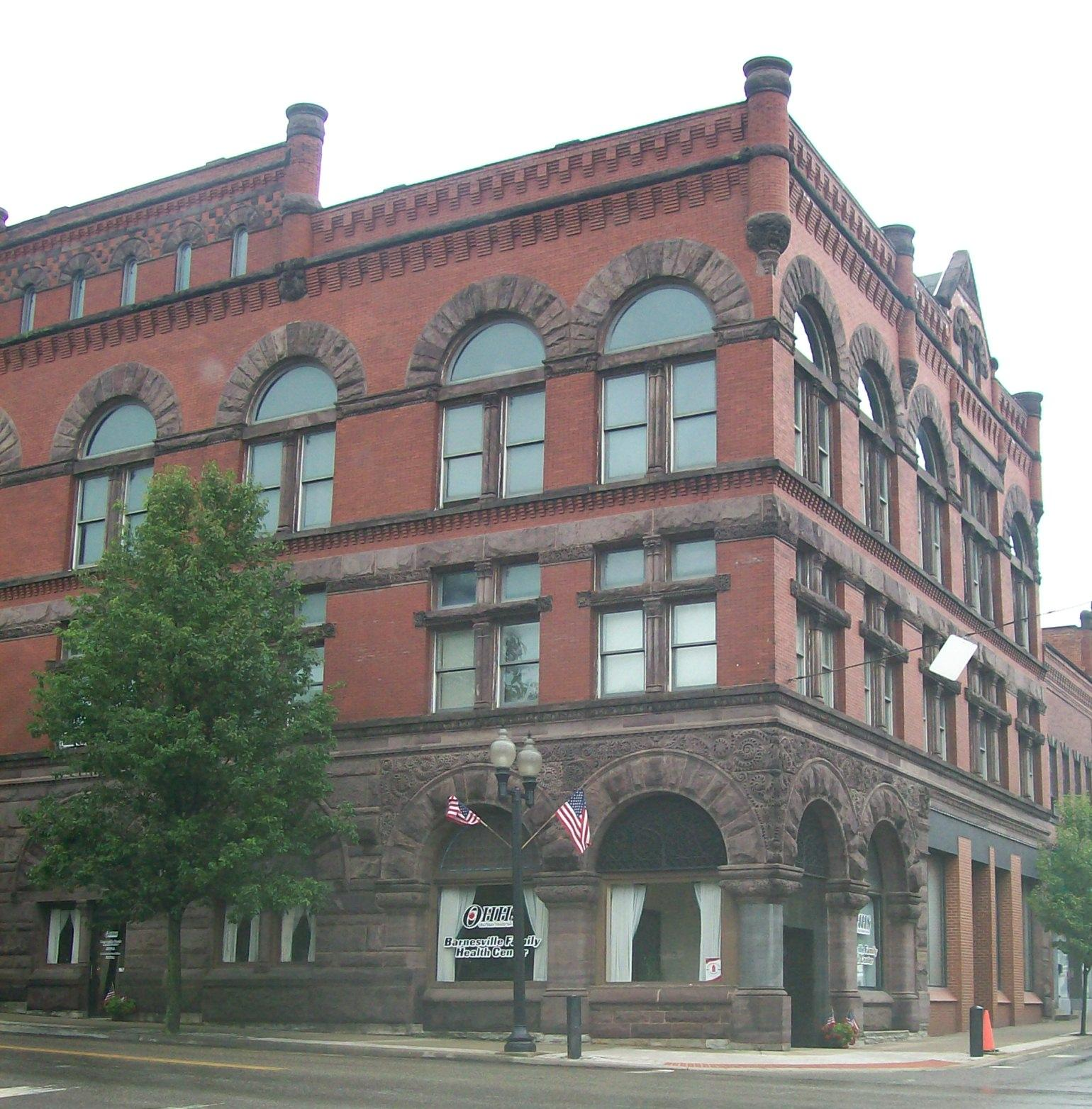
The Bradfield Building.

Many of the buildings currently standing date back to the Victorian era of building. The district includes several buildings well known in the area, such as the Bradfield Building, which once housed The 1st National Bank founded in 1865, by John Bradfield, the Barnesville Municipal Building and the Belmont County Victorian Mansion Museum, as well as several private homes. The district totals 198 structures consisting of 180 contributing properties, as well as the Barnesville Railroad Tunnel located under the intersection of East Main and Arch Streets.

Much of the district play key roles in the Annual Barnesville Pumpkin Festival held every September, including West Main Street: the site of the King Pumpkin display.

== Prominent contributing properties ==
- Barnesville Presbyterian Church at 124 North Chestnut Street - Chinese pagoda-influenced church built by Frank Packard.
- Belmont County Victorian Mansion Museum at 532 North Chestnut Street - a prominent Romanesque Revival house of the influential Bradfield family.
- The Arthur Rogers House, Thomas Rogers House, and Thomas Jefferson Buchanan House at 502, 520, and 416 North Chestnut Street - Last remaining Second Empire-style houses in Barnesville.
- Bradfield Building at 101 East Main Street - Romanesque Revival building built for the First National Bank of Barnesville.
- Barnesville Municipal Building at 132 North Arch Street - Romanesque Revival building; only contributing property not located within district's bounds.
