= New Hampshire Pumpkin Festival =

Annual autumn and pumpkin festival in New Hampshire

Coordinates: 42.93132°N 72.27797°W

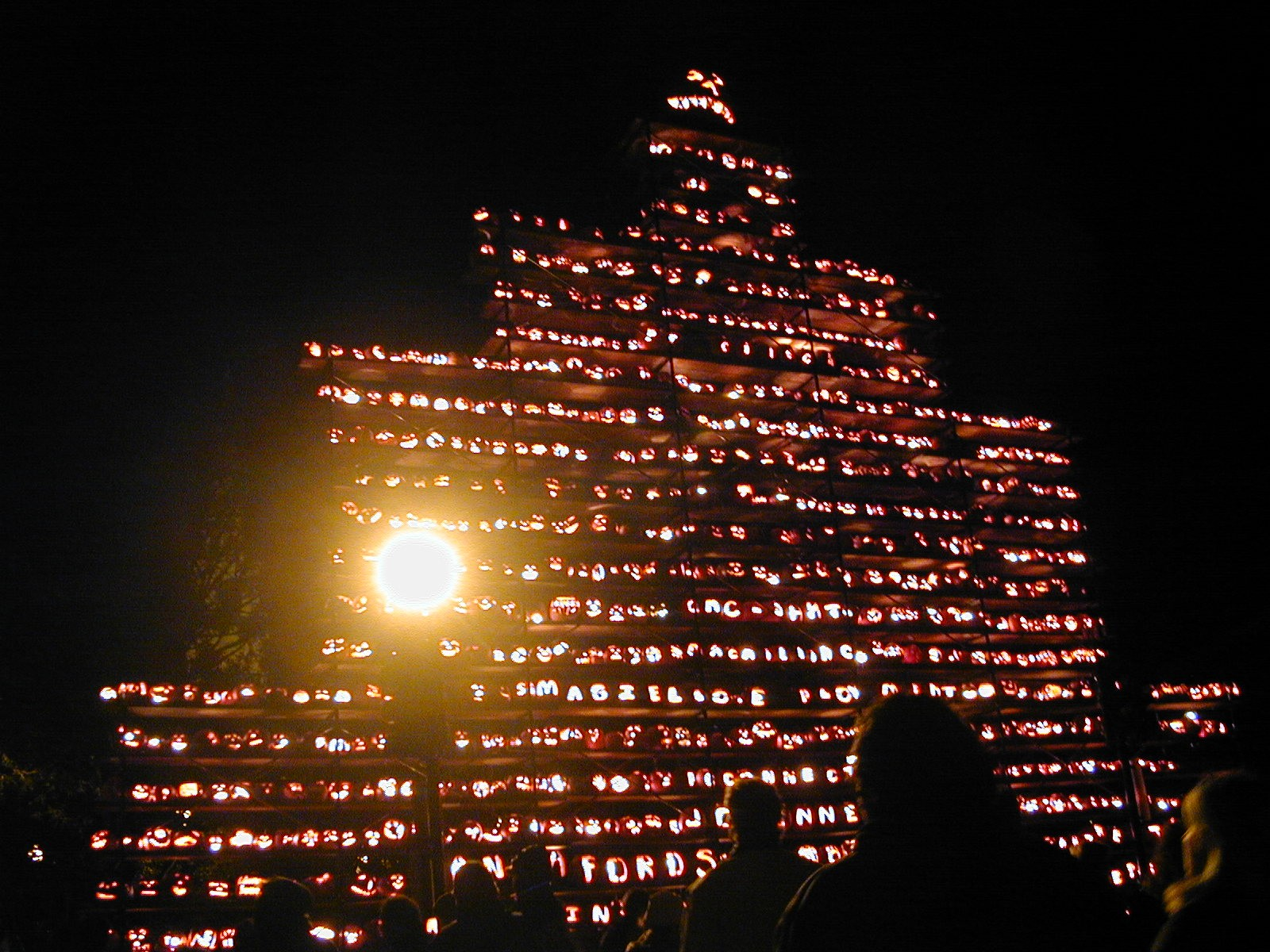
- A few of the tens of thousands of pumpkins on display at the 2000 Keene Pumpkin Festival
- Genre: Autumn, Halloween, pumpkin lighting
- Frequency: October
- Locations: Keene, New Hampshire, United States (1991–2014); Laconia, New Hampshire, United States (2015–2019, 2022–)
- Inaugurated: 1991
- Founder: Nancy Sporborg
- Most recent: October 27–28, 2023
- Next event: October 26, 2024 (Note: According to the official website, activities will begin on October 22, 2024, and will run through Halloween (October 31, 2024); the October 26 date is for the festival's "Full Day of Fun".)
- Attendance: 40,000 (2017)
- Organizer: Center Stage Cheshire County (1991–2010); Let it Shine, Inc. (2011–2015); Lakes Region Chamber of Commerce (2016–2019, 2022–; assisting organizers in 2015)
- Sponsor: Zippo Manufacturing Company
- Website: www.nhpumpkinfestival.com

The New Hampshire Pumpkin Festival (also known as the Keene Pumpkin Festival from 1991 to 2014, and the Laconia Pumpkin Festival in 2015; often referred to as Pumpkin Fest) is a pumpkin festival that is held in Laconia, New Hampshire, United States before Halloween. Each year, New Hampshire residents and citizens attempt to amass the largest number of lit jack-o'-lanterns in one place, trying to meet or beat the world record, which the city of Keene, New Hampshire—the festival's venue for its first 24 years—held for many years.

The 24th festival in 2014 gained notoriety when parties held by Keene State College students in the area led to riots a relatively short distance from the festival grounds. This resulted in the Keene City Council rejecting the festival's annual permit for the following year. Laconia took over as the festival's host city in 2015, with the Lakes Region Chamber of Commerce taking over from previous festival organizers, Let it Shine the following year after having assisted them in the 2015 festival. A new annual, scaled-down Keene Pumpkin Festival organized by Let it Shine—unrelated to the former one but promoted by the organizers as the "official" continuation of it—was first held on October 29, 2017, and has continued in this iteration ever since. The official website for the New Hampshire Pumpkin Festival has also since retroactively referred to the festival being a separately started event rather than a continuation of the Keene-originating event by instead stating that it began in Laconia in 2015, not in Keene in 1991.

== History ==
For the first decade of its existence, the Keene Pumpkin Festival regularly set the record for the most lit jack-o'-lanterns, culminating in the figure (as recognized by the Guinness World Records) of 28,952 lit jack-o'-lanterns on October 25, 2003, but this was broken when Boston, Massachusetts, collected 30,128 on October 21, 2006. Keene took the record back with a total of 30,581 on October 19, 2013.

The organizers attempt yearly to beat the record by encouraging businesses, organizations, schools, and individuals to create and donate jack-o'-lanterns, which are displayed on many enormous banks of shelves and all available surfaces around the center of town. The festivities also include fireworks, music, and food, and draw in people from all over New Hampshire and adjoining states. Almost immediately after the festival is over, the pumpkins are hauled away by volunteer work crews and given to pig farmers, to use as food.

The event is held on a Saturday in mid-to-late-October. Keene Pumpkin Festival 2009 was held on Saturday, October 17, and an estimated 70,000 people attended the event. The official total, announced on October 21, was 29,762 pumpkins, a new Keene record, but not enough to beat the world record. The largest ever crowd to attend the event was in 2006, which drew an estimated 80,000 people from around the world to downtown Keene. By comparison, the population of Keene is nearly 23,000.

In 2010, the Keene Pumpkin Festival organizers, Center Stage Cheshire County, stepped down from running the event, leaving it in limbo for 2011. The festival was able to secure new organizers, however, and the Pumpkin Festival continued in 2011, taking place on October 22.

=== 2014 riots and move to Laconia ===
During the 2014 festival, large parties not related to the festival involving Keene State College students and visitors from several other colleges in the area, led to a series of riots less than a mile from the festival grounds. The Keene City Council subsequently voted not to grant a permit for the next year's festival. Organizers arranged for the event to be moved to Laconia for its twenty-fifth event in 2015. The 25th pumpkin festival was held on October 24, 2015, and reported that 9,567 pumpkins were displayed. Meanwhile, a new group of organizers formed the Monadnock Pumpkin Festival, held in the town of Swanzey adjacent to Keene on the same weekend, at which an estimated 5,500 pumpkins were displayed.

Let it Shine, Inc., which organized the 2011 through 2015 festivals, did not organize the New Hampshire Pumpkin Festival from 2016 onwards. The Lakes Region Chamber of Commerce, which assisted in the 2015 festival, has been the sole organizer since. In 2017, the Keene City Council and Mayor Kendall Lane approved a new, unrelated pumpkin festival that was held in the city's Central Square by Let it Shine on October 29, 2017. This festival was deliberately made smaller and geared towards children in order to avoid events similar to the rioting at the 2014 festival, with an imposed cap of 5,000 pumpkins and no vendors.

In July 2020, the Lakes Region Chamber of Commerce announced the cancellation of the 2020 festival due to the COVID-19 pandemic in New Hampshire. On June 1, 2021, the organizers announced that the 2021 festival had also been canceled; it returned on October 15 and 16 (erroneously first announced for October 14 and 15), 2022.

== Yearly pumpkin count ==
- 1991 - Harvest Festival - 600
- 1992 - 1st World Record - 1,628
- 1993 - 2nd World Record - 4,817
- 1994 - 3rd World Record - 10,540
- 1995 - "Rainy Pumpkin Festival" - 9,812
- 1996 - 4th World Record - 13,044
- 1997 - 5th World Record - 13,432
- 1998 - 6th World Record - 17,693
- 1999 - Pumpkin Festival - 16,349
- 2000 - 7th World Record - 23,727
- 2001 - Pumpkin Festival - 22,633
- 2002 - "Second Rainy Pumpkin Festival" - 18,882
- 2003 - 8th World Record - 28,952
- 2004 - Pumpkin Festival - 27,584
- 2005 - "Year of the Flood" Pumpkin Festival - 22,157
- 2006 - Pumpkin Festival - 24,682
- 2007 - Pumpkin Festival - 25,644
- 2008 - Pumpkin Festival - 22,568
- 2009 - Pumpkin Festival - 29,762
- 2010 - 20th Annual Pumpkin Festival - 22,943
- 2011 - Pumpkin Festival, "Let it Shine!" - 16,186
- 2012 - Pumpkin Festival - 29,381
- 2013 - 9th World Record - 30,581
- 2014 - Pumpkin Festival - 21,912
- 2015 - 25th Pumpkin Festival (Laconia Pumpkin Fest) - 9,567

== See also ==
- Pumpkin
- Pumpkin festival (for other such festivals)
- Pumpkin queen
