= Me and the Pumpkin Queen =

Children's book by Marlane Kennedy

- HarperCollins/Greenwillow Books 1st Edition (hardcover)
- Author: Marlane Kennedy
- Illustrator: Marla Frazee
- Language: English
- Genre: Middle grade literature Coming of age
- Publisher: HarperCollins; Greenwillow Books (imprint)
- Publication date: 2007
- Publication place: United States
- ISBN: 0061140228 (hardcover edition)
- OCLC: 1036713169

Me and the Pumpkin Queen is a 2007 children's novel by Marlane Kennedy with cover art by Marla Frazee, following the story of Mildred and her best friend, Jacob, two preteens who work to grow a pumpkin worthy of winning an upcoming contest in honour of Mildred's deceased mother, a former "Pumpkin Queen" of their small rural town.

Me and the Pumpkin Queen was first published in hardcover by Greenwillow Books, an imprint of HarperCollinsPublishers. The book's subject is inspired by Kennedy's youthful familiarity with the Circleville Pumpkin Show. The book has been chosen as a Junior Library Guild Selection. Santa Monica Public Library also lists the book as recommended reading for kids.

== Plot ==
Eleven-year-old Mildred grieves the loss of her beloved mother when she was younger and struggles to get along with her pushy Aunt Arlene, who wants Mildred to be more feminine and mature. A tomboy with an avid interest in agriculture, Mildred's only friend is a local boy, Jacob, and Mildred fixates on her mother being a former "pumpkin queen". Inspired by an image of her mother "wearing her Pumpkin Queen crown," Mildred tries to grow giant pumpkins in order to win a contest at the Circleville Pumpkin Show. Mildred struggles with the pumpkins and finds herself increasingly stressed about protecting them, to the point where when some are damaged, she begins sobbing, causing Jacob to feel so sorry for his friend that he cries, as well. Mildred's father and aunt express concern, and Mildred's aunt tries to get her to wear "girly" clothes and take a stronger interest in fashion and socialization.

After winning the contest, Mildred is finally able to reconcile her grief and start letting go of the past, and while still interested in farming and gardening, she embraces the idea of friendship and growing up. She begins to get along better with her aunt after her aunt expresses deep worry for her that she overhears, leading her to realize that she misunderstood her aunt's intentions. Mildred is able to appreciate her own uniqueness while growing and changing at the same time.

== Reception ==
The book has received a positive reception from reviewers. J. A. Kaszuba Locke describes the book as "a chummy read, projecting heartwarming tenderness and a youngster's determination." Robin Smith describes the book as a "marvelously heartwarming story [that] deserves a big blue ribbon!" Naomi Kirsten asserts that the book is "Big on heart and pumpkins!" Kathryn Kosiorek notes that "The author combines the art and science of horticulture with a gentle family story, a feel for a child in mourning, and just the right amount of humor and tension to keep the plot moving along." Ilene Cooper refers to "Kennedy's straightforward narrative" as "lovely." Finally, Kennedy has received praise for her inclusion of "unexpectedly fascinating pumpkin-horticulture facts" in the book.

== See also ==
- Pumpkin queen
