= Pumpkin Queen =

Autumnal title

Pumpkin Queen is a title awarded at many North American beauty contests held in autumn. The contests to choose a pumpkin queen typically occur during festivals. At some festivals, a variety of contestants, from babies to boys, compete for other pumpkin titles. These include "Miss Pumpkin", "Pumpkin Princess", "Mister Pumpkin", and "Pumpkin Seed". In fiction, the title may also refer to the ruler of an autumnal fantasy world.

== History ==
Pumpkin festivals in various American states include pageants to select a pumpkin queen. The Circleville Pumpkin Show is the oldest pumpkin show in Ohio; it has been held annually since 1903. The festival draws large crowds of up to a half million people. Beginning in 1933, the festival began selecting a Miss Pumpkin. The festival was cancelled in 2020 due to the COVID-19 pandemic. The festival was also cancelled three other times related to both World War I and World War II.

For fifty years the town of Spring Hope, North Carolina, has held a contest to select the Spring Hope Miss Pumpkin Queen in conjunction with the Spring Hope National Pumpkin Festival. Since 1964 Barnesville, Ohio, hosts the Barnesville Pumpkin Festival, where they also have a queen pageant. In Rutland County, Vermont a Pumpkin Queen is crowned each year, and they have hosted the Halloween Pumpkin Princess Tea and Pageant since 1964.

The West Virginia Pumpkin Festival selects a Pumpkin Festival Queen, Teen, Ms, MRS, and they choose a variety of other contestants to hold pumpkin titles from babies to boys. In Confluence, Pennsylvania, they host a PumpkinFest Queen Pageant at the event which they call PumpkinFest. Beginning in 1971 Spring Hope, North Carolina, hosts a Pumpkin Festival where they crown a Pumpkin Queen.

=== Pumpkin Princess ===
Some festivals involve younger contestants and confer the title of Pumpkin Princess. Morton, Illinois, hosts the Morton Pumpkin Festival annually and has given their city the title of "Pumpkin Capital of the World." Each year they crown a Pumpkin Princess at the festival. The pageant is only open to children between five and six years old. The pageant in Confluence, Pennsylvania, gives titles to young children and babies with titles like Pumpkin Tot and Mister Pumpkin. The Spring Hope, North Carolina, Pumpkin Festival crowns a Baby Pumpkin Seed during their Pumpkin Festival.

== In fiction ==
A number of works of fiction have titles which include a Pumpkin Queen or Pumpkin Princess. Long Live the Pumpkin Queen is a book by Shea Ernshaw about a young girl (Sally, a fictional character from the Tim Burton film The Nightmare Before Christmas) who is crowned Pumpkin Queen: Queen of Halloween Town. The book was released as a commercial tie-in with the Tim Burton universe. The Pumpkin Queen is a short film directed by Angie Hansen. The film is about a scientist who wants revenge against the Monroe County Pumpkin Queen.

In 2007, author Marlane Kennedy wrote Me and the Pumpkin Queen, a novel centred entirely around the subject of a preteen girl, Mildred, and her best friend, local town boy Jacob, trying to grow the perfect pumpkin in honour of Mildred's deceased mother, a former Pumpkin Queen. Kennedy incorporated real-life references to Canadian varieties of special pumpkins, agricultural tips for growing pumpkins, rural lore about the culture of pumpkin-growing, and her own personal experiences attending the Circleville Pumpkin Show in her youth.

== See also ==
- Queens of Industry
