= Barnesville-Bradfield Airport =

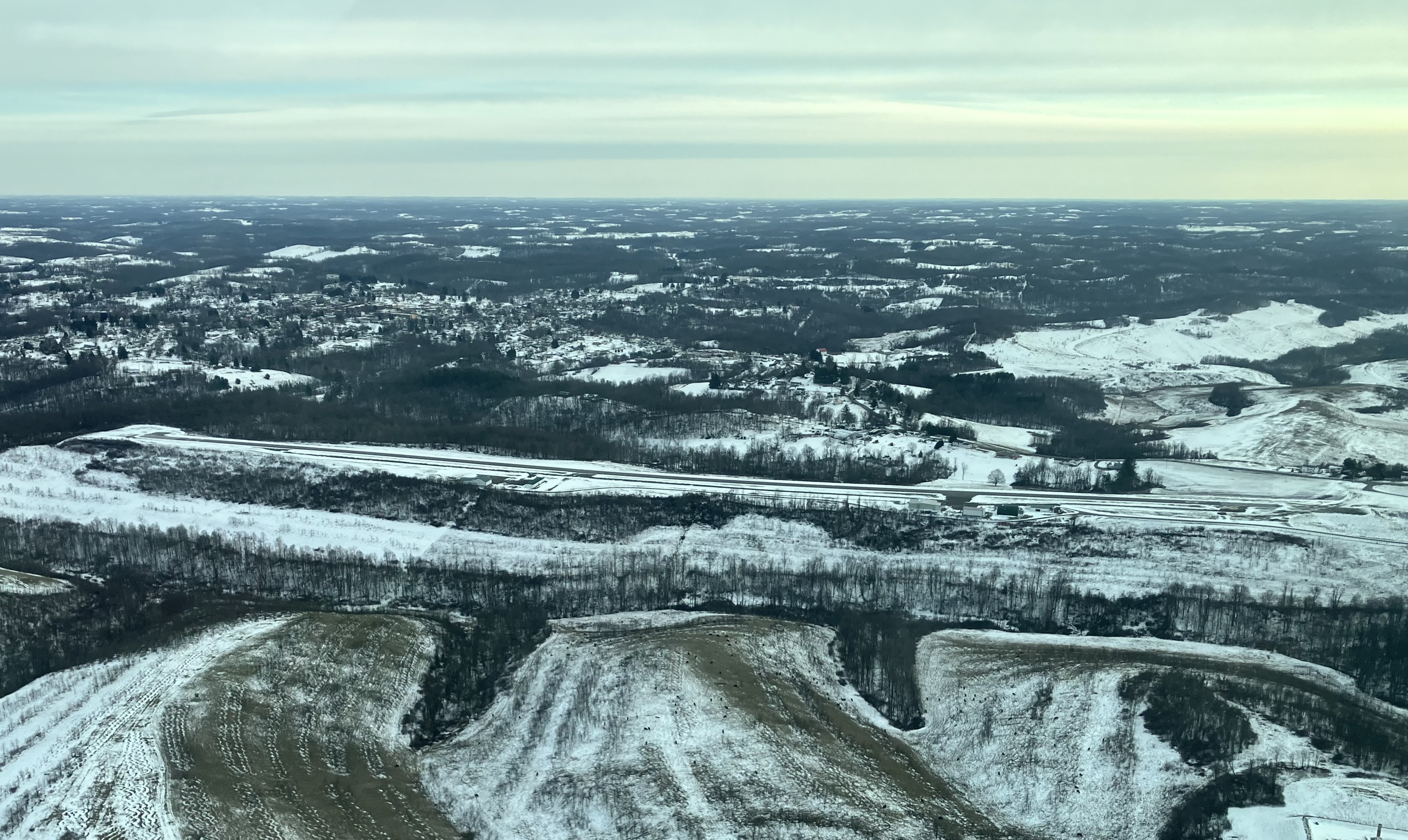
- IATA: none; ICAO: none; FAA LID: 6G5

Summary
- Owner/Operator: Belmont County Regional Airport Authority
- Serves: Barnesville, Ohio
- Location: Belmont County, Ohio
- Time zone: UTC−05:00 (-5)
  - Summer (DST): UTC−04:00 (-4)
- Elevation AMSL: 1,312 ft (400 m)
- Coordinates: 40°00′09″N 081°11′28″W
- Website: https://barnesvilleohio.com/community/airport/

Maps
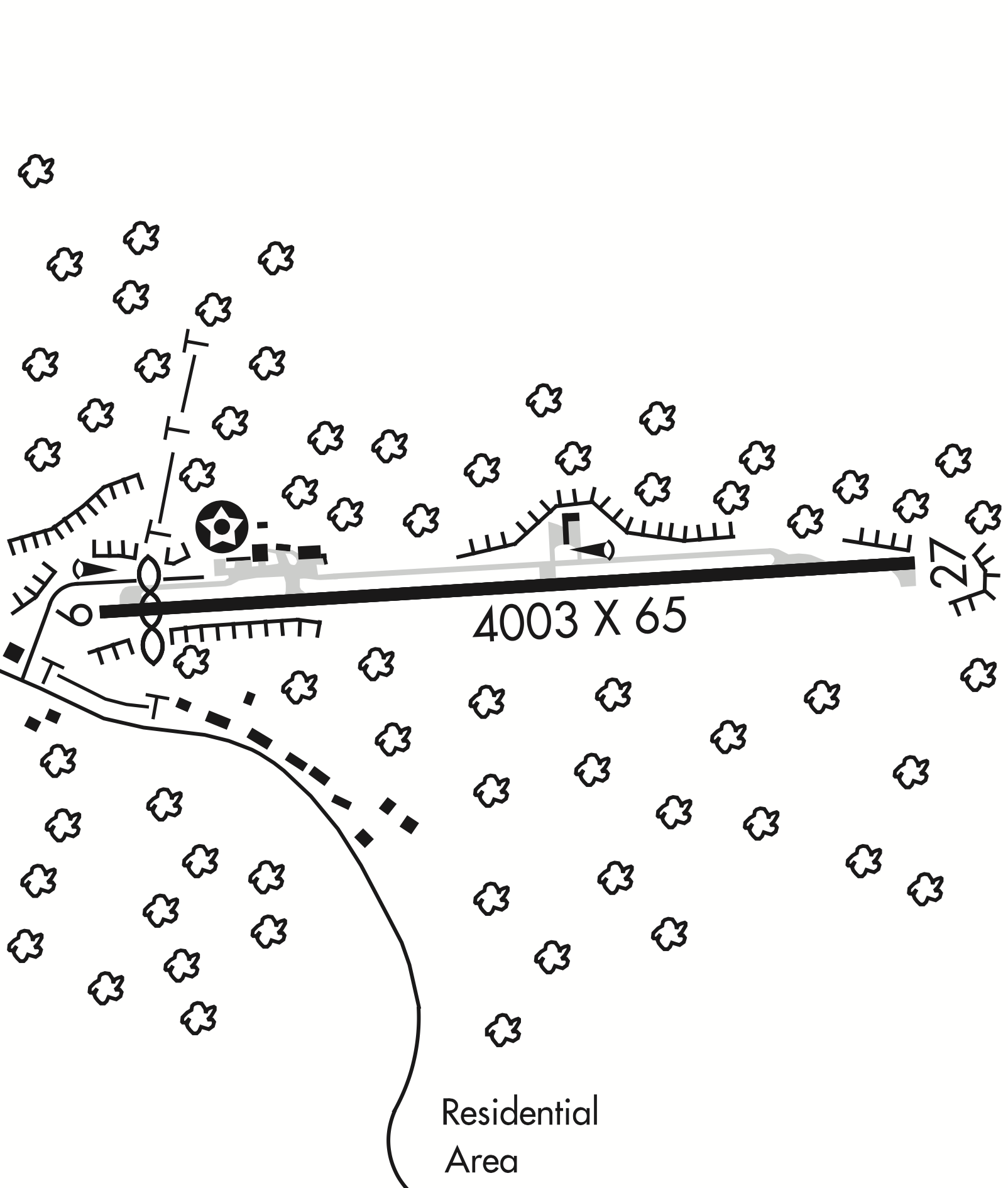

- Location within Ohio Location within the United States

Runways
Direction	Length		Surface
Direction	ft	m	Surface
9/27	4,003	1,220	Asphalt

Statistics (2020)
- Aircraft movements: 5,069
- Source: Federal Aviation Administration

The Barnesville-Bradfield Airport (FAA LID: 6G5) is a publicly owned, public use airport located 1 mile northwest of Barnesville, Ohio, United States, in Belmont County. The airport sits on 55 acres at an elevation 1312 feet (400 m).

The airport is included in the National Plan of Integrated Airport Systems (NPIAS) as a General Aviation facility.

The airport holds an annual Airport Day in early summer. The event includes aircraft displays, airplane rides, games, and food. The Airport Authority, Barnesville Chamber of Commerce and the Village of Barnesville sponsor the event to generate interest in aviation, especially as a career field, and promote the airport's role in boosting the local economy.

== History ==
Gibson, a powerboat racer, and John Bradfield, a World War II Navy veteran and banker, created the private airstrip in 1946. It was managed by Clyde Wittenbrook, who also ran a nearby ski slope called Poverty Hill, for at least 17 years.

After initially designating Barnesville as the county airport in late November 1966, the county rescinded it a few weeks later after the owner of Alderman Airport made an alternative proposal. A study of the Alderman site was then requested. A contract to widen and pave the runway was awarded in late June 1967. The land was donated to the county by John Bradfield in early January 1968 and construction on the runway was ready to begin by August. The airport and its 400-foot (120 m) runway extension were dedicated on 25 May 1969. (Note: The original length of the runway is unclear. According to different sources, it was either 3,000 feet (910 m) or 3,500 feet (1,100 m) long. The discrepancy is likely the result of confusion between the length of the paved area and length of the obstruction fee area.) At the event, the facility was renamed Barnesville-Bradfield Airport. A subsequent $50,000 state grant paid for the completion of a 3,500-by-30-foot (1,066.8 m × 9.1 m) parallel taxiway, creation of a ramp, addition of an airport beacon and installation of a weather station by late October 1971.

The airport was under the control of the Barnesville Village Council until it was handed over to the Belmont County Regional Airport Authority in September 2009. The Village had been working on the move for five years; the airport authority was officially established in 2007 and held its first meeting in April 2008, just over a year before taking charge of the airport.

In 2020, the airport received over $2 million from the Federal Aviation Administration to improve the runway's paving and clear safety areas at either end of the runway.

By May 2021, work had begun on relocating the airport access road, as it had been too close to the end of the runway.

In 2022, $3 million was invested to make improvements at the airport. The money went towards purchasing extra land to expand airport facilities and build out the airport's hangars to offer more room to new tenants who want to base their planes at the airport.

== Facilities and aircraft ==
The airport has one runway, designated as Runway 9/27. It measures 4,003 ft × 65 ft (1,220 m × 20 m) and is paved with asphalt. For the 12-month period ending July 29, 2020, the airport had 5,096 aircraft operations, an average of 98 per week. This included 99% general aviation and 1% military. For the same time period, 11 aircraft were based at the airport, all airplanes: 10 single-engine and 1 multi-engine.

The airport has a fixed-base operator that offers fuel – both avgas and jet fuel – and limited amenities.

== Accidents and incidents ==
- On 7 October 1990, an L-100 made an emergency landing at the airport due to smoke in the cockpit. The runway was damaged as it was not designed for an aircraft of such weight.

== See also ==
- List of airports in Ohio
