= Belmont County Victorian Mansion Museum =

Historic house in Ohio, United States

- The Belmont County Victorian Mansion Museum
- U.S. Historic district – Contributing property
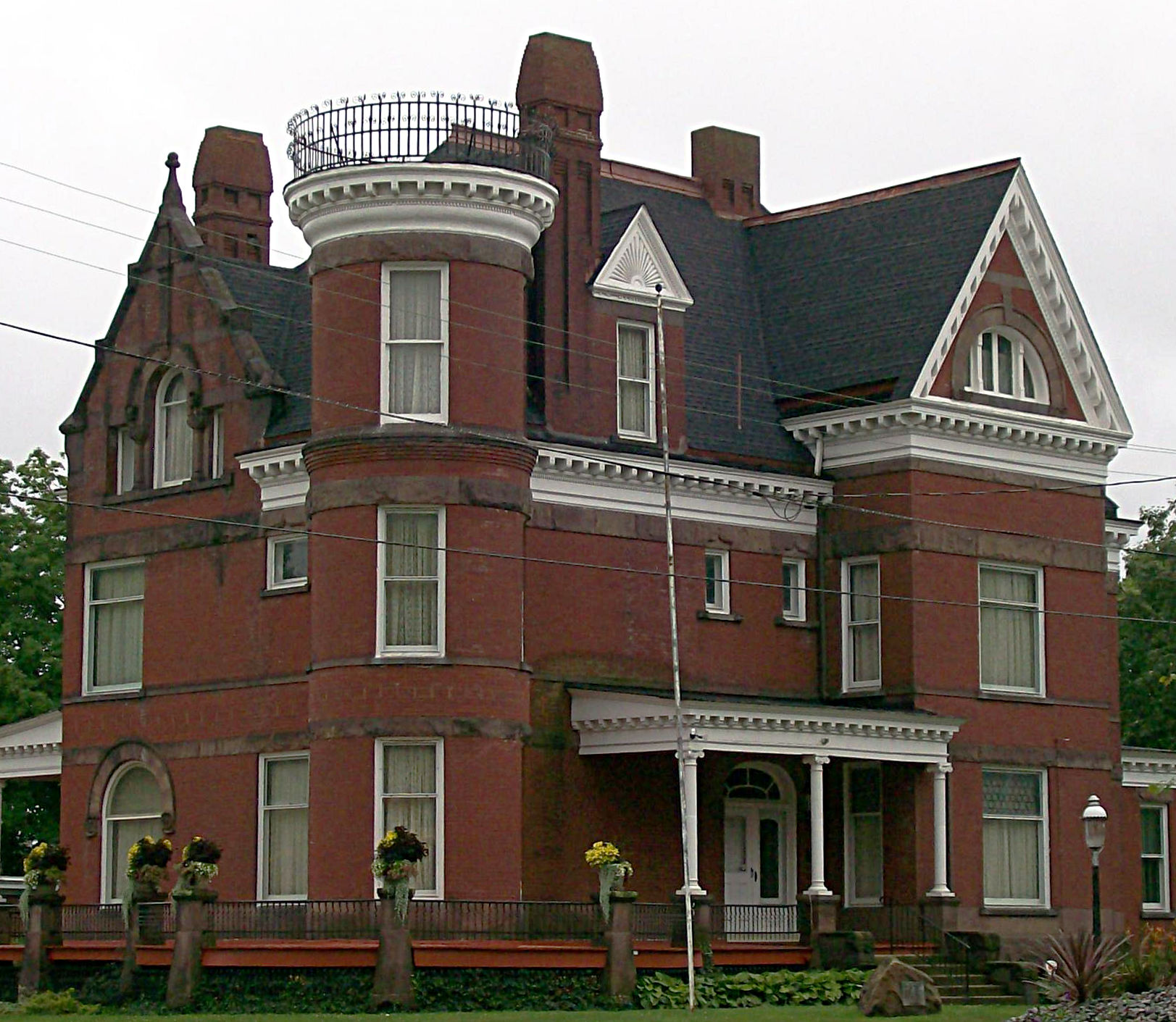
- The Victorian Mansion Museum

- Location within Ohio Location within the United States
- Coordinates: 39°59′17″N 81°10′32″W
- Built: 1893
- Architectural style: Romanesque
- Part of: Barnesville Historic District (ID84002899)
- Added to NRHP: July 19, 1984

The Belmont County Victorian Mansion Museum is located at 532 North Chestnut Street in Barnesville, Ohio. The mansion's construction began in 1888 and was completed in 1893. A gazebo was added to the property in the 90's and is a popular place for many weddings.

== History ==
The Mansion Museum was built in 1888 to 1893 and was designed in the Romanesque style. The house stayed in the possession of the Bradfield family, who built it, until the 1960s. The house had sat vacant for several years and plans were made to raze the structure to make way for a gas station. The house was purchased by John Bradfield and Everett Hanlon for $10,000 and was turned over to the Belmont County Historical Society. John Bradfield was the nephew of John William and lived next door at the time of Pearl Bradfield Watts death.

== Exterior ==
The large mansion is constructed of red brick and sandstone with white trim. Large rectangular windows light the house. The house rises two floors with a mansard roof containing the attic/third floor. Dormers protrude from the roof and a large pediment is located on the front facade. A large turret is located on the northern facade and contains a balcony with wrought iron fencing.

At one point an elegant porch wrapped around the entire length of the mansion, but this was removed for safety reasons. The porch contains a wooden plank floor with sandstone pillars. Today the only part still standing is the porch covering the carriage entrance. The porch is supported by four Ionic columns with an entablature and dentil molding. Flashing can still be seen running along the walls where the porch was once attached. The entrance is framed by a fan light and side lights with a large white solid wood door.

== Interior ==
The house contains 26 rooms decorated in the Victorian era designs. Beautiful oak fretwork welcomes visitors to the entrance parlor. The eye is instantly drawn to the handcarved griffin found in the woodworking to the bottom right. The dining room is located to the right of the entrance with two parlors to the left. The great hall runs past the fretwork and contains an inglenook known as a "Courting Fireplace" with cast-iron firebox. A large oak stairway leads to the upper floors. Off the landing is the growlery, where the men would go after dinner to discuss the issues of the day.

The second floor contains 5 bedrooms, two dressing rooms and two bathrooms. The bathrooms are decorated in 22K gold trim, mirroring the bathroom below, which is decorated with 22K gold and ruby marble. The bathrooms are fed water from a 540-US-gallon (2,000 L) tank on the third floor, used as for storage or other amenities.

The backstairs lead down to the first floor. The kitchen with its original soapstone sink and coal stove is located to your left, with the butlers pantry just beyond containing the original copper sink and the household china. The cabinetwork in these rooms are all northern pine, a tree now extinct.

The basement can be reached by another flight of stairs and contains tools and utensils throughout the history of house, many of which were used in the building of the mansion. One of the oddities is a child-sized coffin set as a reminder of the high mortality rate during child-birthing in the 1800s.
