= Barnesville station (Ohio) =

- Barnesville Baltimore and Ohio Railroad Depot
- U.S. National Register of Historic Places
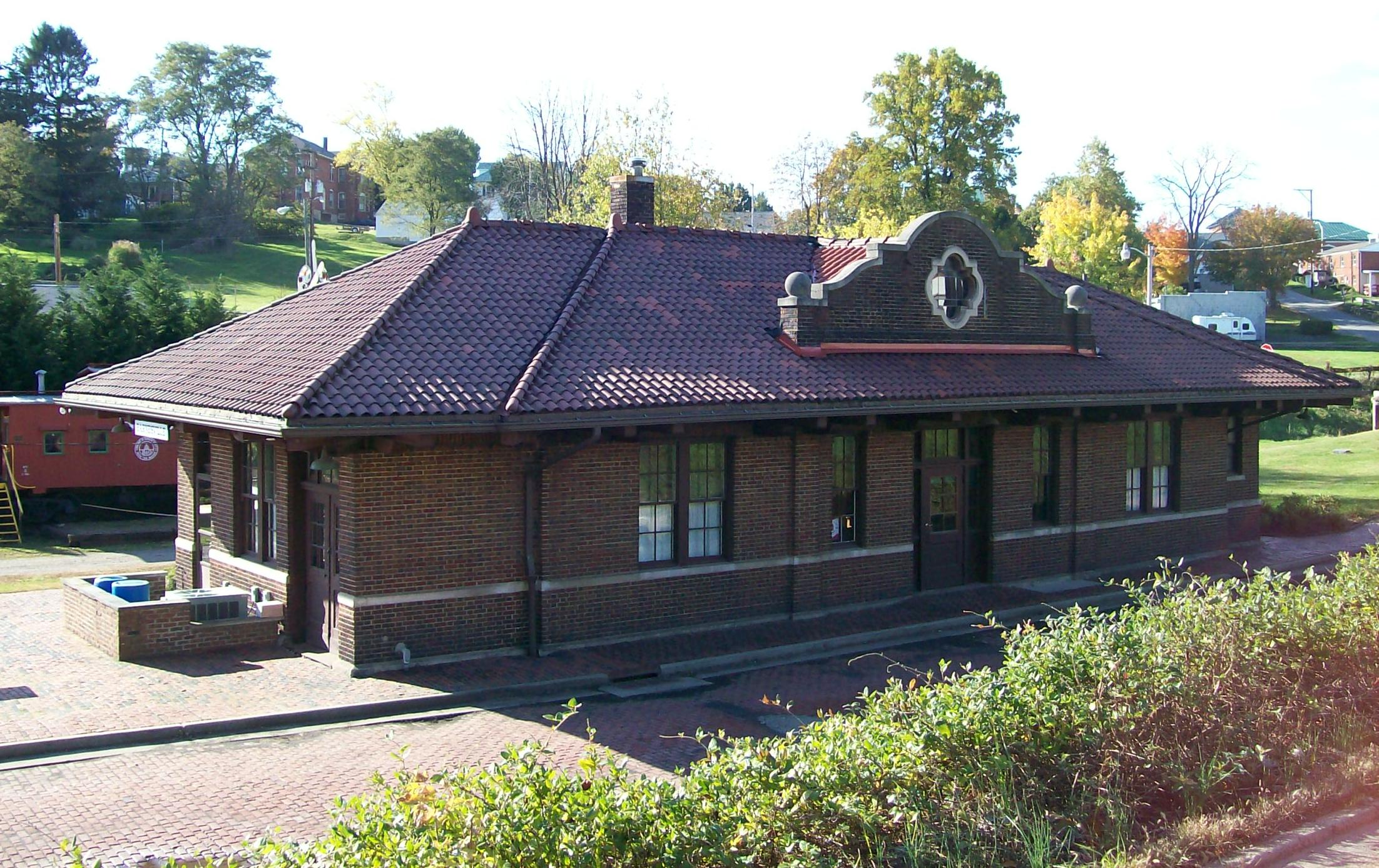
- Barnesville B&O Railroad Depot viewed from Mulberry Street.

- Location within Ohio Location within the United States
- Location: 300 E. Church St., Barnesville, Ohio
- Coordinates: 39°59′19″N 81°10′24″W
- Built: 1916
- Architect: M. A. Long; Patterson, W.H. & Son
- Architectural style: Mission/Spanish Revival
- NRHP reference No.: 85001694
- Added to NRHP: August 8, 1985

Barnesville station is a historic train station in Barnesville, Ohio. It is located at 300 East Church Street, between Mulberry and Railroad Streets. The building was placed on the National Register of Historic Places on August 8, 1985, as the Barnesville Baltimore and Ohio Railroad Depot.

== History ==
=== Founding to Rails: 1808-1960 ===
The village of Barnesville was platted in 1808 by James Barnes, who took advantage of a Drovers' road that ran through the area from the Ohio River. This road, as well as National Road, led to Barnesville being populated quickly. A railroad line was laid out through Barnesville in the middle 1850s and a wooden freight house was built close to the current location of the depot. Passenger service for the town was located in a corner room of the freight house until 1914, when the town was granted a depot by the B&O Railroad.

The depot was opened in 1916 and was heralded by the local newspaper as "long needed and greatly desired." The depot was the site of many city events, including troop send-offs during World War I, World War II, and the Korean War, as well as several Farmers' markets held on the site.

=== Decline: 1960-1984 ===
The area surrounding the depot once consisted of manufacturers and warehouses like the Watt Car and Wheel Company and The Barnesville Glass Company, but has changed to mostly residential. The wooden freight house was demolished in 1962, leaving the depot as the only substantial building on the site. Besides the railroad tunnel west of the site, the depot is the only building in Barnesville relating to the important era of rail in the town. The last passenger departed the depot in 1961. The Chesapeake and Ohio Railway took over the B&O Railroad and operated the depot as offices and freight depot until 1983, when they vacated the "eastern division."

=== Redevelopment: 1984-present ===
The building sat vacant and was primarily opened for the Barnesville Pumpkin Festival for exhibits on the early years of Barnesville and the history of the railroad and its impact on the town. The Barnesville Area Chamber of Commerce occupied the depot as offices from late 1990s until 2006, when they moved to a site in downtown Barnesville.

The depot has been the center of activity as the Governor's Rails to Trails program will place a path along the old railway route from the depot to the east end of the town limits and may lead to an extension of the trail to the western limits as well.

A pavilion was built beside the depot on the foundations of the old freight house and is the site of the Barnesville Farmers Market as well as events during the Barnesville Pumpkin Festival

== Appearance ==
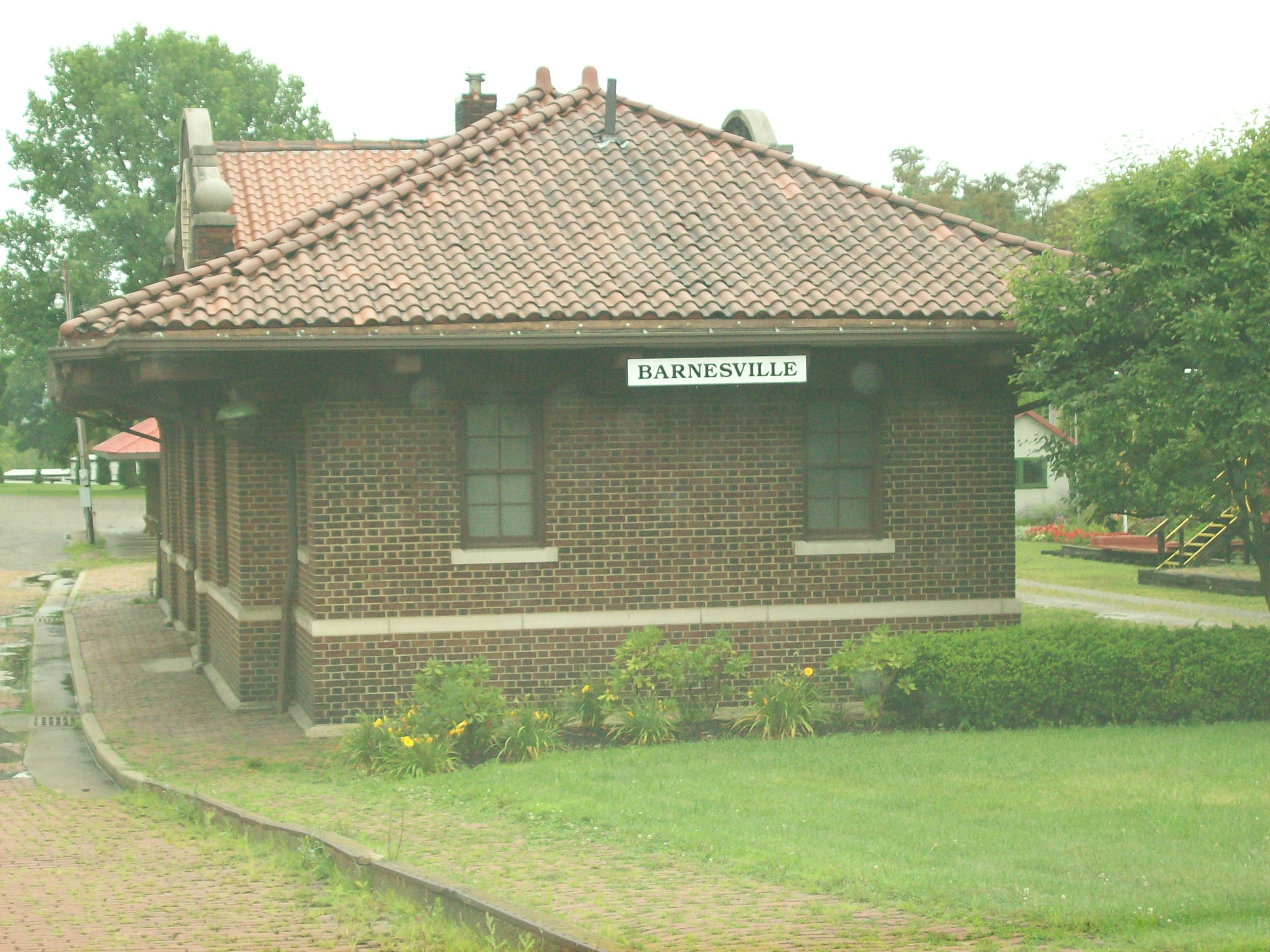
Side view with station sign viewed from Church Street.

The depot is built in a Federal style with Spanish Mission elements. The building is a rectangular one-story structure built with buff red bricks in flemish bond with a stone watertable. The depot is surrounded by a brick road leading uphill to Church Street (the depot sits in a depression 30 feet lower than the city).

Flat arched windows are double-sashed and contain either 6/6 or 4/4 panels and are set back from the exterior wall. A central door surrounded by a fanlight and side panels rest in the middle of the building. To either side of the door is a window and an unadorned pilaster. A double panel window lights either side of the building. The last 8 feet of the building then sets back from the footprint.

The roof protrudes about 5 feet from the wall and is supported by solid molded brackets. The roof is tiled in a reddish colored clay. The roof is protruded by a Mission-style dormer, the window is surrounded by a pillar topped by a stone ball. The dormer rises in a step/curved pattern to an arch. The stylized window lights the waiting room below.

The design of the depot reflects many others built by the B&O Railroad during the early 1900s.

== See also ==
- Barnesville station

Preceding station	Baltimore and Ohio Railroad	Following station
Former services
Eldon toward Cincinnati	Cincinnati – Pittsburgh	Tacoma toward Pittsburgh
