= Virginia Pumpkin Festival =

The Virginia Pumpkin Festival is an annual event held from 2007 to 2019 and since 2021 in the town of Virginia, County Cavan in the Republic of Ireland. The festival takes place every bank holiday weekend at Halloween at the end of October.

== History ==
The festival began in 2007 with crowds of up to ten thousand. The festival began on Friday. On Saturday was the pumpkin king and queen competition, won by Avril Soden and Martin Tynan, when contestants representing the public houses in the town were interviewed. On Sunday afternoon, the main event of the festival took place: a pumpkin competition and weigh-in followed by a parade. The winner of the Virginia Pumpkin Competition was Ed Molloy from County Longford.

In 2008, additional events were also added, including a fancy dress Halloween party, kids' treasure hunt, and cookery demonstrations. The Whirlygig Fire parade was followed by a fireworks display. The festival also featured live performances from Shane MacGowan, Sharon Shannon and Mundy. There was also a street performance from the Whirligig theatre group who travelled from County Donegal.

In 2009, Bell X1 performed over the weekend and there was also music from Country music singers Declan Nerney and Philomena Begley.

In 2013, the Festival was launched by famous chef Richard Corrigan.
