= Barnesville, Ohio =

- Village
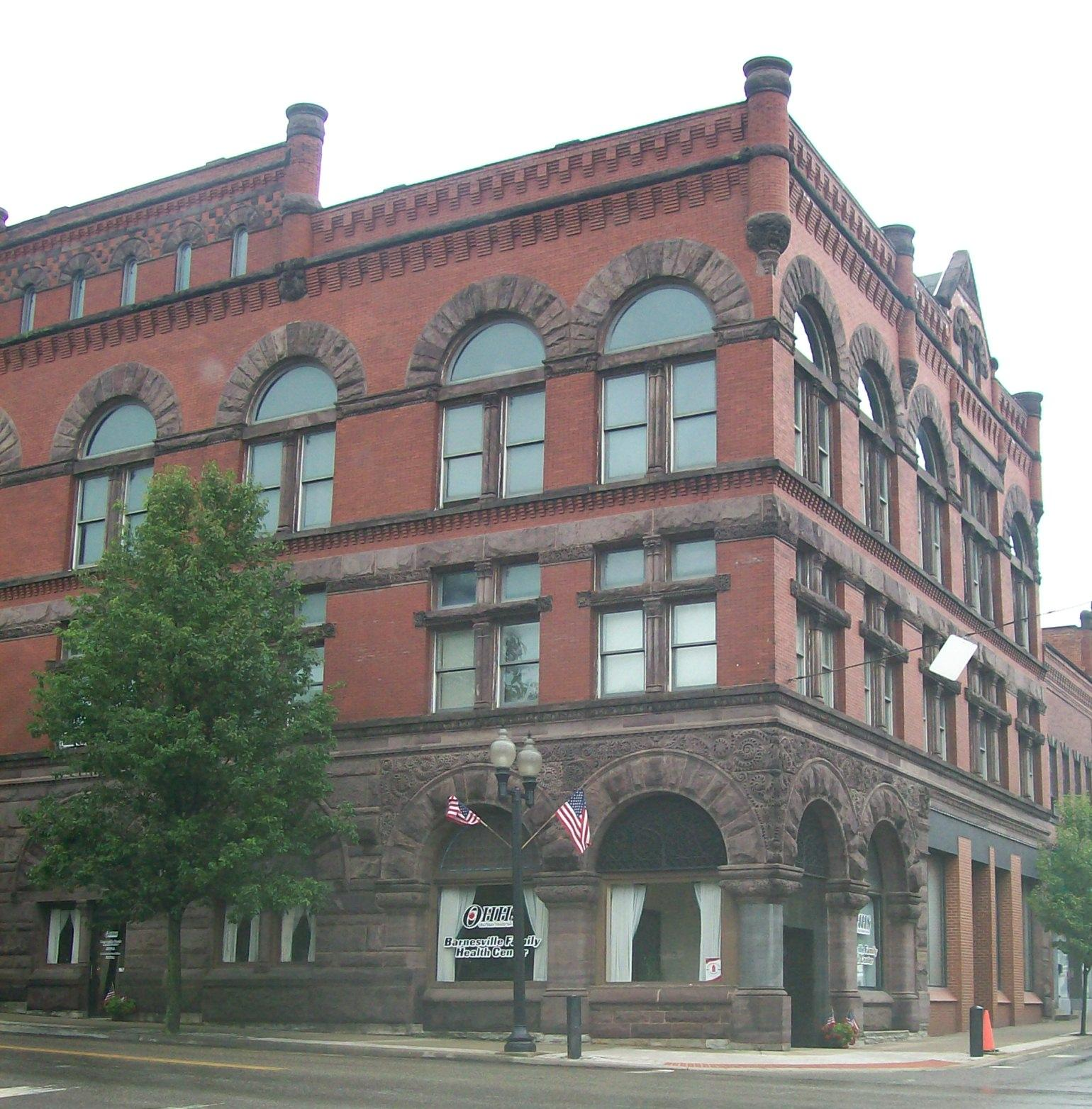
- Bradfield Building within the Barnesville Historic District

- Logo
- Motto: "Where History Meets Progress"
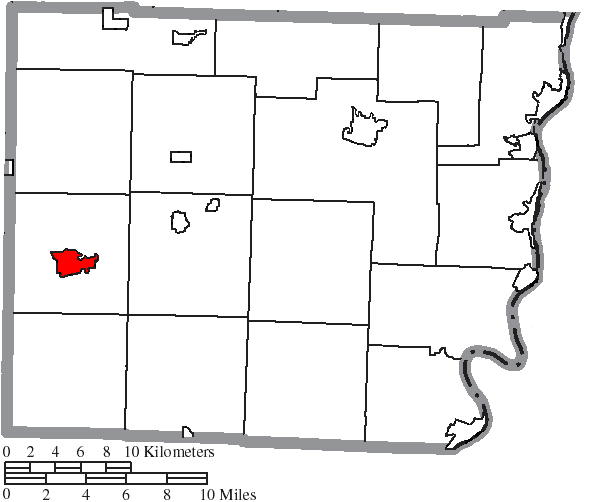
- Location of Barnesville in Belmont County, Ohio

- Location within Ohio Location within the United States
- Coordinates: 39°59′35″N 81°10′55″W
- Country: United States
- State: Ohio
- County: Belmont
- Township: Warren
- Founded: November 8, 1808
- Incorporated: 1835

Government
  - Type: Non-Charter Municipality Mayor-council government
  - Mayor: Jake Hershberger
  - Founder: James Barnes and David Barnes

Area
  - Total: 2.08 sq mi (5.38 km^{2})
  - Land: 2.05 sq mi (5.31 km^{2})
  - Water: 0.027 sq mi (0.07 km^{2})
- Elevation: 1,273 ft (388 m)

Population (2020)
  - Total: 4,008
  - Estimate (2023): 3,908
  - Density: 1,954.8/sq mi (754.76/km^{2})
- Time zone: UTC-5 (Eastern (EST))
  - Summer (DST): UTC-4 (EDT)
- ZIP code: 43713
- Area code: 740
- FIPS code: 39-03926
- GNIS feature ID: 2398034
- Website: Barnesville Ohio

Barnesville is a village in Belmont County, Ohio, United States. It is located in the central portion of Warren Township. The population was 4,008 at the 2020 census. Barnesville is part of the Wheeling metropolitan area.

== History ==
The town was named after James Barnes, who was the first settler. Barnes was born in Montgomery County, Maryland and was married to Nancy Harrison, "an intelligent Quaker lady". Barnes owned a farm in Montgomery County, and later laid out a town there, also known as Barnesville, Maryland, where he operated a country store for a while.

In 1803, he moved to St. Clairsville, Ohio, where he operated a tavern and general store. In 1806, Barnes settled in Warren Township in Belmont County where he cleared forest, built a house, established a tannery and general store and planted orchards. In November 1808, the town of Barnesville was laid out, and four years later, Barnes and his family became permanent residents of the new village. Barnesville was described in 1833 as having six stores and a steam mill.

Barnesville was incorporated as a village in 1835.

== Geography ==
According to the United States Census Bureau, the village has a total area of 1.95 square miles (5.05 km^{2}), of which, 1.94 square miles (5.02 km^{2}) is land and 0.01 square miles (0.03 km^{2}) is water.

=== Climate ===
Climate data for Barnesville, Ohio, 1991–2020 normals, extremes 1939–2007
Month	Jan	Feb	Mar	Apr	May	Jun	Jul	Aug	Sep	Oct	Nov	Dec	Year
Record high °F (°C)	75 (24)	76 (24)	84 (29)	90 (32)	93 (34)	96 (36)	100 (38)	103 (39)	101 (38)	89 (32)	83 (28)	75 (24)	103 (39)
Mean daily maximum °F (°C)	35.5 (1.9)	39.2 (4.0)	49.1 (9.5)	61.7 (16.5)	71.5 (21.9)	78.9 (26.1)	82.7 (28.2)	81.9 (27.7)	75.6 (24.2)	64.4 (18.0)	50.8 (10.4)	40.9 (4.9)	61.0 (16.1)
Daily mean °F (°C)	28.0 (−2.2)	30.7 (−0.7)	39.0 (3.9)	50.6 (10.3)	60.5 (15.8)	68.8 (20.4)	72.9 (22.7)	71.2 (21.8)	64.9 (18.3)	54.0 (12.2)	42.2 (5.7)	33.4 (0.8)	51.4 (10.8)
Mean daily minimum °F (°C)	20.6 (−6.3)	22.1 (−5.5)	29.0 (−1.7)	39.5 (4.2)	49.4 (9.7)	58.8 (14.9)	63.1 (17.3)	60.5 (15.8)	54.3 (12.4)	43.5 (6.4)	33.5 (0.8)	25.9 (−3.4)	41.7 (5.4)
Record low °F (°C)	−25 (−32)	−21 (−29)	−19 (−28)	3 (−16)	21 (−6)	30 (−1)	40 (4)	36 (2)	25 (−4)	14 (−10)	−13 (−25)	−17 (−27)	−25 (−32)
Average precipitation inches (mm)	3.06 (78)	2.57 (65)	3.52 (89)	3.69 (94)	4.67 (119)	4.65 (118)	4.45 (113)	3.40 (86)	3.46 (88)	3.11 (79)	3.79 (96)	3.43 (87)	43.80 (1,113)
Average snowfall inches (cm)	11.2 (28)	7.8 (20)	4.9 (12)	1.6 (4.1)	0.0 (0.0)	0.0 (0.0)	0.0 (0.0)	0.0 (0.0)	0.0 (0.0)	trace	1.5 (3.8)	6.5 (17)	33.5 (84.9)
Average precipitation days (≥ 0.01 in)	12.9	11.2	11.6	13.8	13.7	11.3	9.9	9.3	9.6	10.1	12.4	13.9	139.7
Average snowy days (≥ 0.1 in)	6.4	5.3	3.3	0.5	0.0	0.0	0.0	0.0	0.0	0.0	1.0	4.5	21.0
Source 1: NOAA (snow/snow days 1981–2010)
Source 2: XMACIS2

== Demographics ==
Historical population
Census	Pop.	Note	%±
1820	291		—
1830	408		40.2%
1840	700		71.6%
1850	823		17.6%
1860	1,157		40.6%
1870	2,063		78.3%
1880	2,435		18.0%
1890	3,207		31.7%
1900	3,721		16.0%
1910	4,233		13.8%
1920	4,865		14.9%
1930	4,602		−5.4%
1940	5,002		8.7%
1950	4,665		−6.7%
1960	4,425		−5.1%
1970	4,292		−3.0%
1980	4,633		7.9%
1990	4,326		−6.6%
2000	4,225		−2.3%
2010	4,193		−0.8%
2020	4,008		−4.4%
2023 (est.)	3,908	▼	−2.5%
U.S. Decennial Census

=== 2020 census ===
As of the 2020 census, Barnesville had a population of 4,008. The median age was 41.0 years. 23.3% of residents were under the age of 18 and 21.9% of residents were 65 years of age or older. For every 100 females there were 86.7 males, and for every 100 females age 18 and over there were 81.2 males age 18 and over.

0.0% of residents lived in urban areas, while 100.0% lived in rural areas.

There were 1,715 households in Barnesville, of which 28.7% had children under the age of 18 living in them. Of all households, 38.0% were married-couple households, 19.0% were households with a male householder and no spouse or partner present, and 35.7% were households with a female householder and no spouse or partner present. About 36.3% of all households were made up of individuals and 18.1% had someone living alone who was 65 years of age or older.

There were 1,977 housing units, of which 13.3% were vacant. The homeowner vacancy rate was 3.2% and the rental vacancy rate was 8.4%.

Racial composition as of the 2020 census
Race	Number	Percent
White	3,796	94.7%
Black or African American	40	1.0%
American Indian and Alaska Native	5	0.1%
Asian	12	0.3%
Native Hawaiian and Other Pacific Islander	0	0.0%
Some other race	12	0.3%
Two or more races	143	3.6%
Hispanic or Latino (of any race)	31	0.8%

=== 2010 census ===
As of the census of 2010, there were 4,193 people, 1,763 households, and 1,114 families living in the village. The population density was 2,161.3 inhabitants per square mile (834.5/km^{2}). There were 2,011 housing units at an average density of 1,036.6 per square mile (400.2/km^{2}). The racial makeup of the village was 97.0% White, 0.9% African American, 0.1% Native American, 0.3% Asian, and 1.6% from two or more races. Hispanic or Latino of any race were 0.6% of the population.

There were 1,763 households, of which 29.4% had children under the age of 18 living with them, 42.4% were married couples living together, 15.7% had a female householder with no husband present, 5.1% had a male householder with no wife present, and 36.8% were non-families. 32.0% of all households were made up of individuals, and 16.3% had someone living alone who was 65 years of age or older. The average household size was 2.28 and the average family size was 2.82.

The median age in the village was 41.4 years. 21.4% of residents were under the age of 18; 8.9% were between the ages of 18 and 24; 23.9% were from 25 to 44; 25.5% were from 45 to 64; and 20.5% were 65 years of age or older. The gender makeup of the village was 46.2% male and 53.8% female.

=== 2000 census ===
As of the census of 2000, there were 4,225 people, 1,769 households, and 1,119 families living in the village. The population density was 2,196.6 inhabitants per square mile (848.1/km^{2}). There were 1,964 housing units at an average density of 1,021.1 per square mile (394.2/km^{2}). The racial makeup of the village was 98.41% White, 0.71% African American, 0.07% Native American, 0.17% Asian, and 0.64% from two or more races. Hispanic or Latino of any race were 0.26% of the population.

There were 1,769 households, out of which 28.9% had children under the age of 18 living with them, 45.5% were married couples living together, 13.9% had a female householder with no husband present, and 36.7% were non-families. 33.7% of all households were made up of individuals, and 18.5% had someone living alone who was 65 years of age or older. The average household size was 2.30 and the average family size was 2.94.

In the village, the population was spread out, with 23.6% under the age of 18, 8.3% from 18 to 24, 25.5% from 25 to 44, 21.7% from 45 to 64, and 20.8% who were 65 years of age or older. The median age was 40 years. For every 100 females, there were 82.0 males. For every 100 females age 18 and over, there were 77.4 males.

The median income for a household in the village was $23,925, and the median income for a family was $31,927. Males had a median income of $25,098 versus $16,119 for females. The per capita income for the village was $14,105. About 21.2% of families and 22.1% of the population were below the poverty line, including 35.1% of those under age 18 and 14.6% of those age 65 or over.

== Arts and culture ==
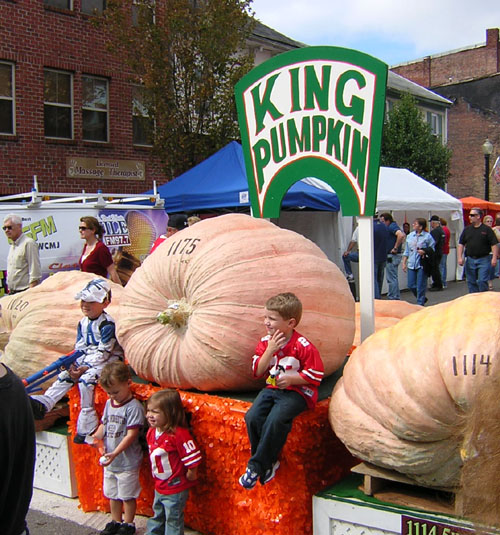
King Pumpkin of the Barnesville Pumpkin Festival in 2008

The Belmont County Victorian Mansion Museum is located in Barnesville. The museum includes twenty-six rooms restored to the Victorian era.

The village is the host of the Barnesville Pumpkin Festival every September, attracting tourists from the area.

The Watt Center for History and the Arts is located in Barnesville. The original office building of the Watt Car and Wheel Company now contains exhibits about coal history and area business, industry, and agriculture. The Watt Car and Wheel Company was founded in 1862 as the Joseph Watt and Son foundry.

== Government ==
The Village of Barnesville’s legislative body consists of a six-member council. Members are elected officials and serve a four-year term.

== Education ==
The village of Barnesville is served by the Barnesville Exempted Village School District. The village's schools saw a renovation in 2002 to improve and expand classroom learning and appearances.

There are three main schools in the village: Barnesville Elementary School, Barnesville Middle School, and Barnesville High School.

Also located in the village is Olney Friends School, a small co-educational boarding high school affiliated with the Religious Society of Friends (Quakers).

== Infrastructure ==
=== Transportation ===
The Barnesville-Bradfield Airport is located one nautical mile (1.2 mi; 1.9 km) northwest of Barnesville's central business district.

== Notable people ==
- Nathan Huntley Edgerton, Union Army officer who received the Medal of Honor
- Elisha Gray, electrical engineer best known for his development of a telephone prototype
- Tom Harp, college football player and coach
- Al Logan, college football coach
- Larry Marmie, college and professional football coach
- Isaac C. Parker, politician and jurist
- Stanley Plumly, poet
- Jay Sawvel, college football coach
- George Shannon, member of the Lewis and Clark Expedition
- Wilson Shannon, first native-born governor of Ohio

== Gallery ==
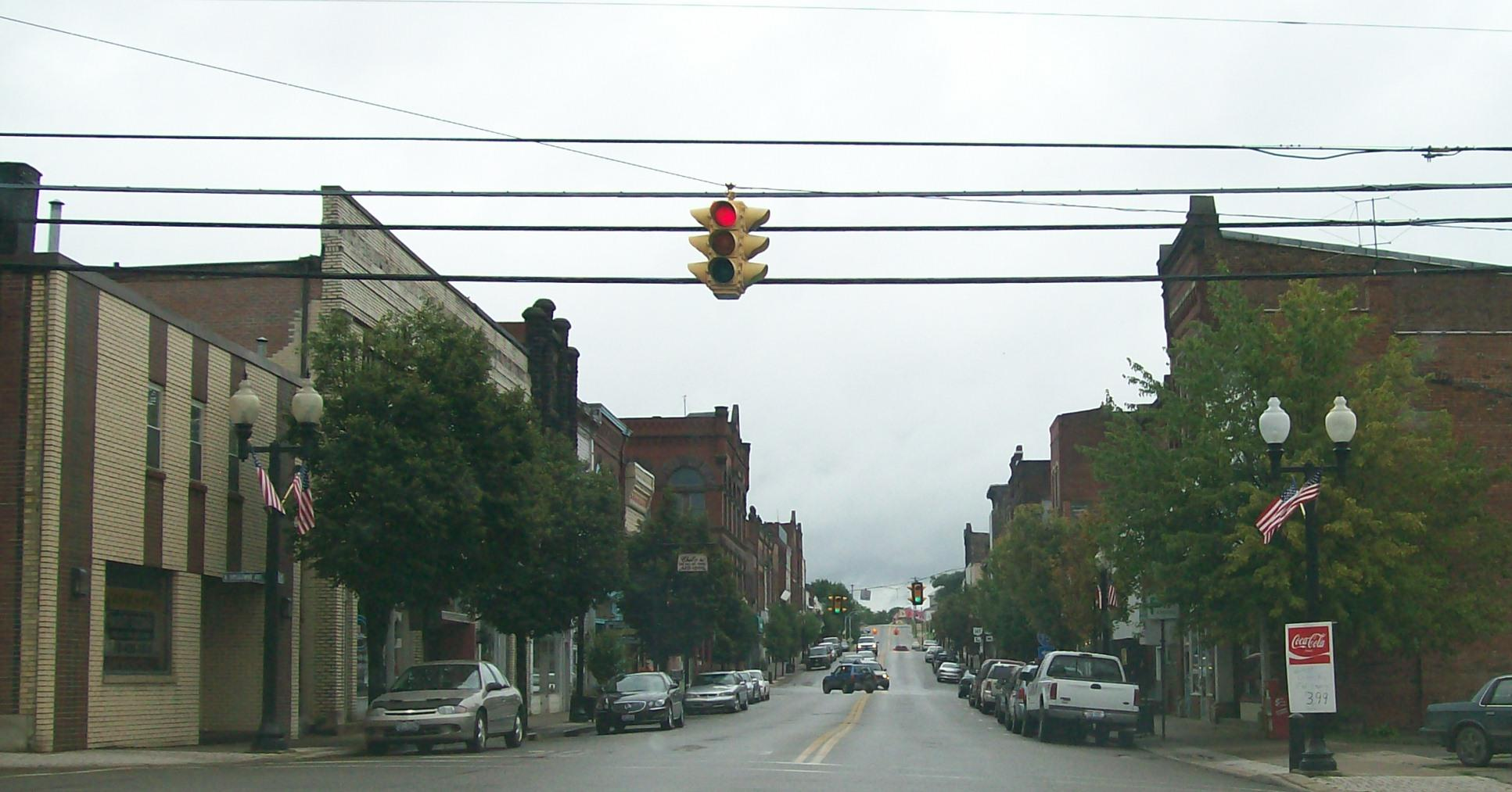
Barnesville Historic District, view of downtown facing East

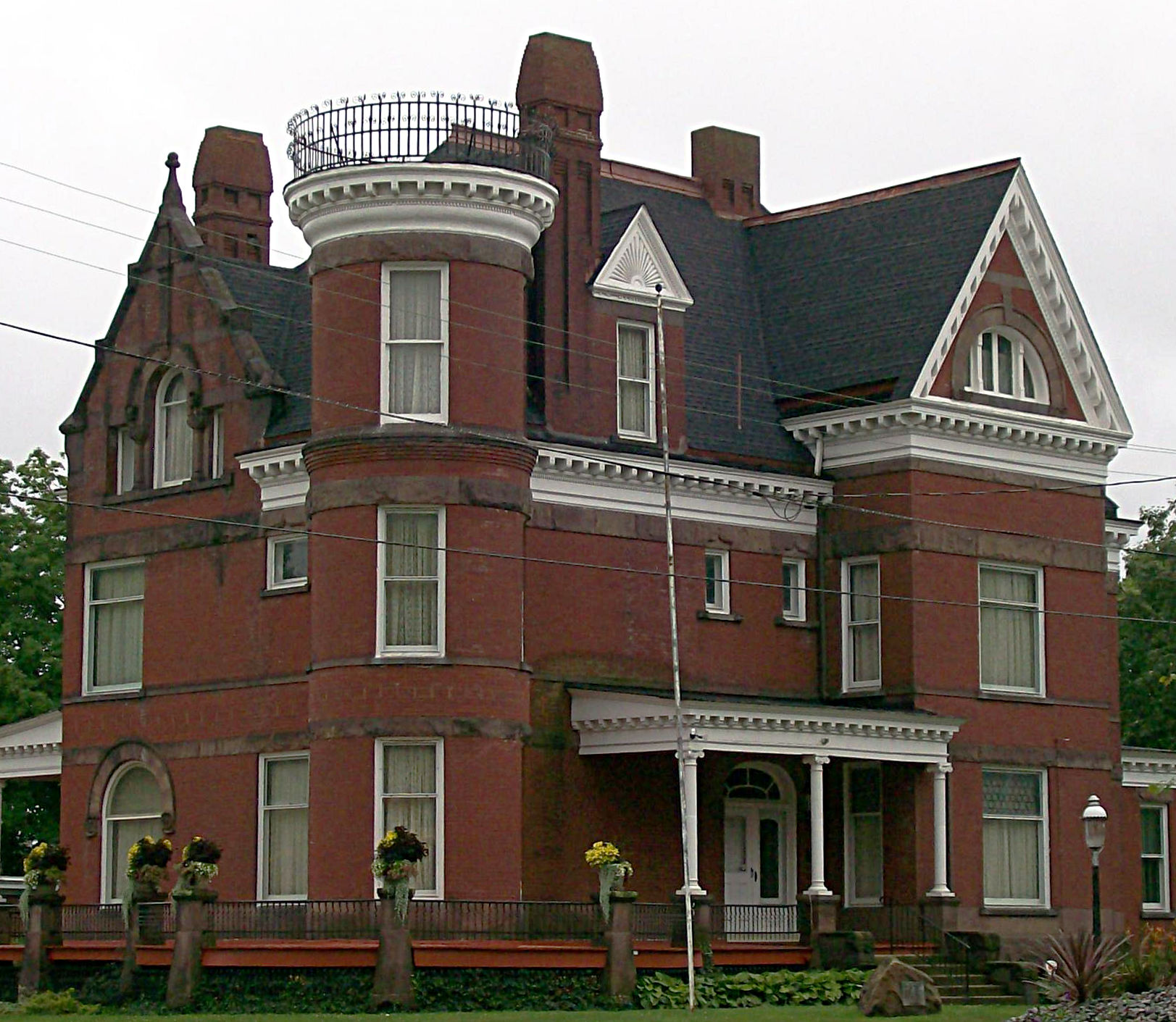
Belmont County Victorian Mansion Museum in Barnesville, built in 1893

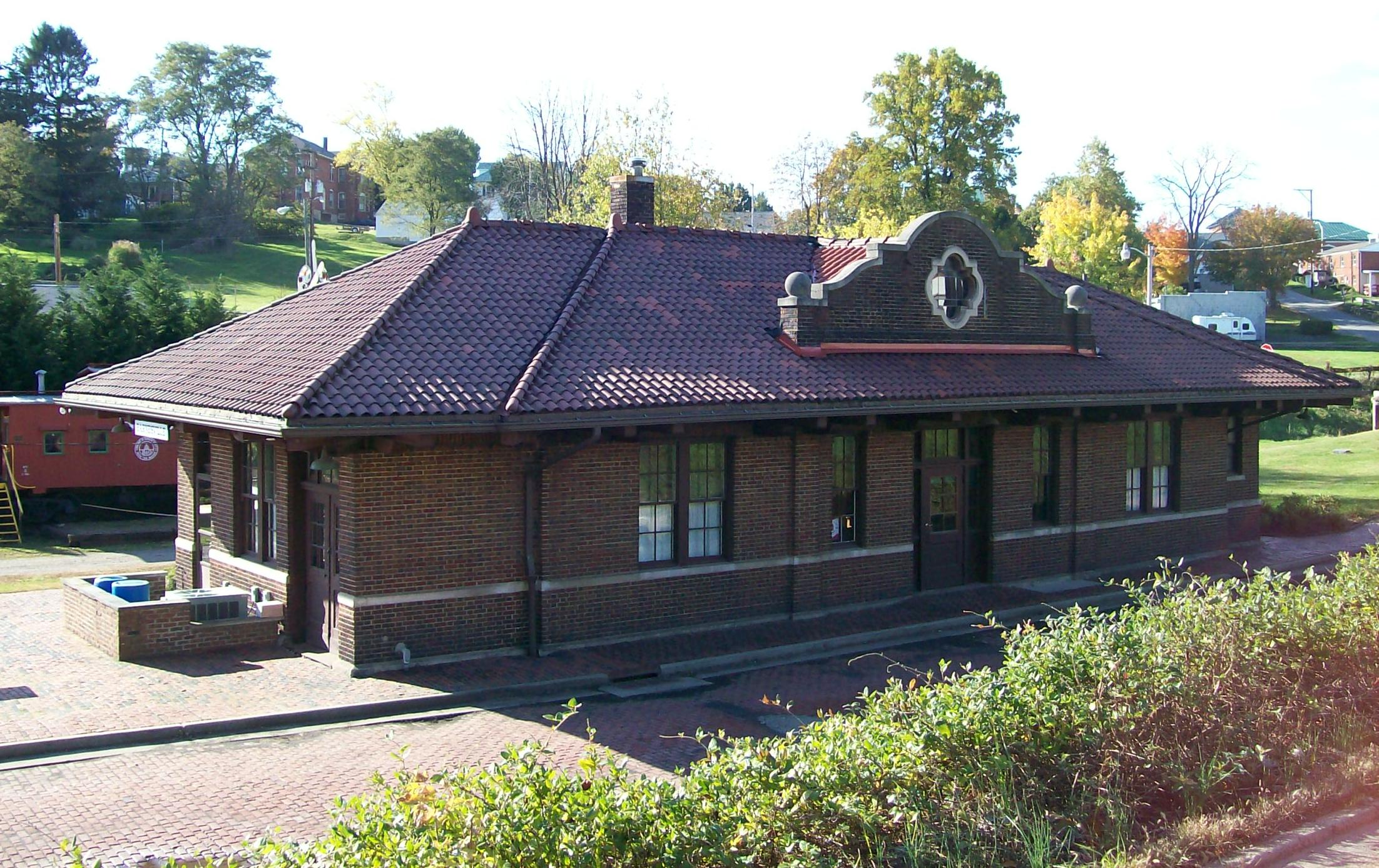
The Barnesville B&O Railroad Depot, built in 1916
