= Olney Friends School =

Location
- 61830 Sandy Ridge Road; Barnesville, (Belmont County), Ohio 43713; United States
- Coordinates: 39°59′4″N 81°9′1″W

Information
- Type: Private, high school
- Religious affiliations: Society of Friends (Quakers); open to students of any religious or cultural background
- Established: 1837
- Head of school: Christian Acemah
- Grades: 9-12
- Gender: Coeducational
- Average class size: 7
- Campus: 350 acres (1.4 km^{2}), rural, including school farm, garden
- Colors: Navy and White
- Athletics conference: Independent
- Team name: Olney
- Accreditation: Independent Schools Association of the Central States
- Tuition: $37,800 (7-day boarding); $31,300 (5-day boarding); $20,500 (day students) (2023-2024)
- Website: www.olneyfriends.org

Olney Friends School is a small, co-educational boarding and day school affiliated with the Religious Society of Friends (Quakers). Located in the foothills of the Appalachian Mountains in Barnesville, Ohio, the school "challenges students to grow, celebrates intellectual vigor, provokes questions of conscience, and nurtures skills for living in community." Students come from around Ohio, around the country, and around the world to study the college prep curriculum. Currently (2017-2018), the school is attended by 53 students from 14 US states and 10 countries (usually about 30% Quaker and 30% international).

Community identity is created each school year during an initial orientation period and maintained through weekend activities, dorm activities, advisory and class meetings, and a variety of service activities. Students work daily in the Main Building and in the residence halls. Sustainability is an ongoing theme in the life of the school, whose 350-acre (1.4 km^{2}) campus includes a certified organic farm that provides food, work, and recreational opportunities for students and staff.

Olney Friends School is chartered by the state of Ohio and accredited by the Independent Schools Association of the Central States (ISACS). They are members of the National Association of Independent Schools (NAIS), the Ohio Association of Independent Schools (OAIS), Friends Council on Education (FCE), the Midwest Boarding Schools Association (MWBS), The Association of Boarding Schools (TABS) and the Small Boarding Schools Association (SBSA).

== Academics ==
Olney Friends School maintains its deep-rooted connection to Quaker values and educational practices, providing an exceptional educational experience for its students who come to Olney from across the United States and around the globe.

Olney Friends School offers a challenging, individualized, college preparatory curriculum with students taking academic course work in math, science and humanities throughout their time, as well as at least two years of Spanish. In addition, students are required to take course work in religion, fine arts and practical skills. Class sizes at Olney are small (avg. 7), allowing teachers to address the needs of each student.

Graduation requirements include 22 hours in traditional academic subjects plus religion, fine arts and practical skills, a 20-page graduation ("graddy") essay, and acceptance into a four-year college. In addition, students must complete a total of 23 combined community service and outdoor education hours annually. Academic classrooms are in "The Main," and students live in boys' and girls' dormitories. More than half the faculty live on campus in the dorms or in campus housing.

== History ==
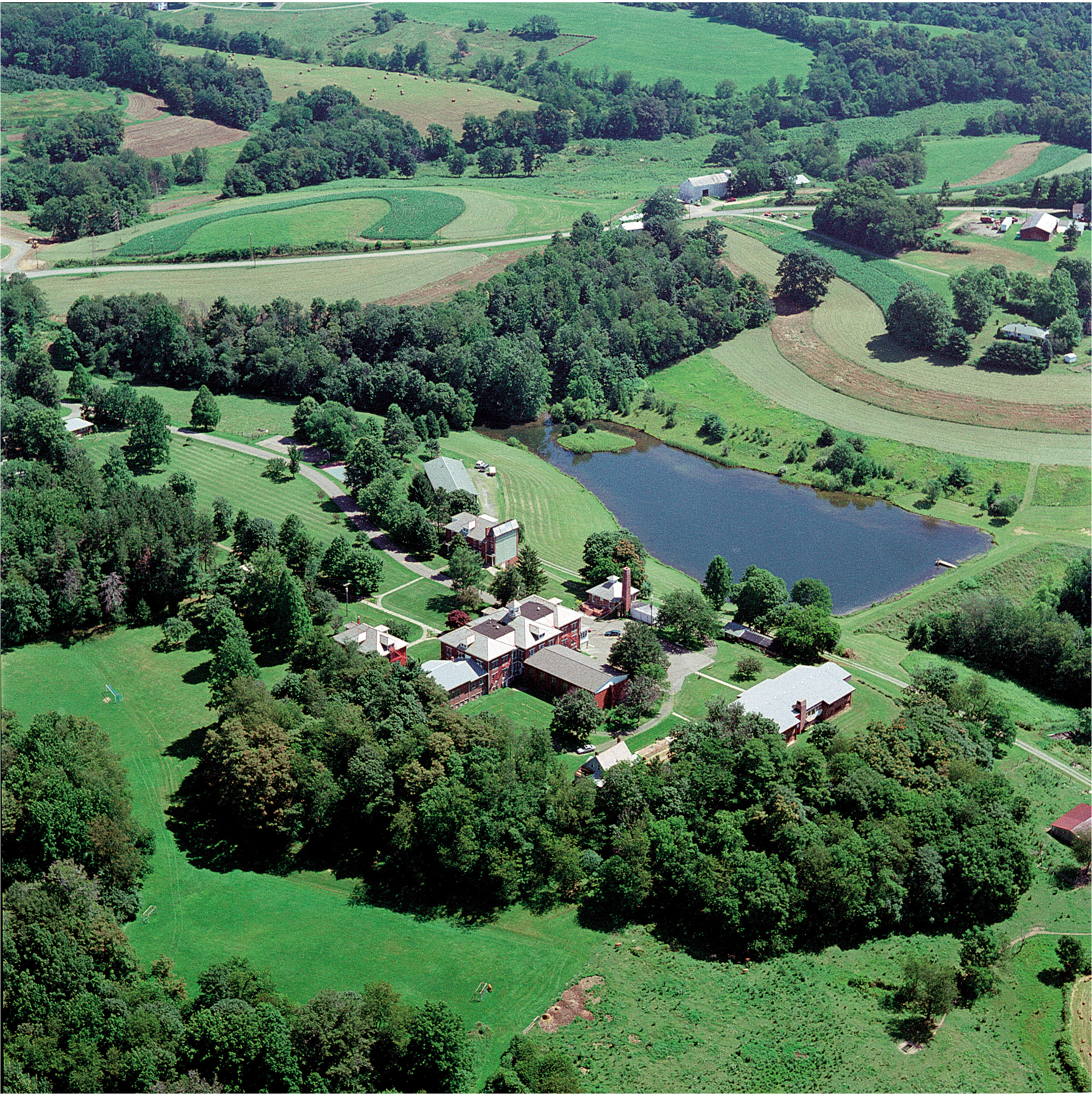
Aerial view of the campus looking from the southwest.

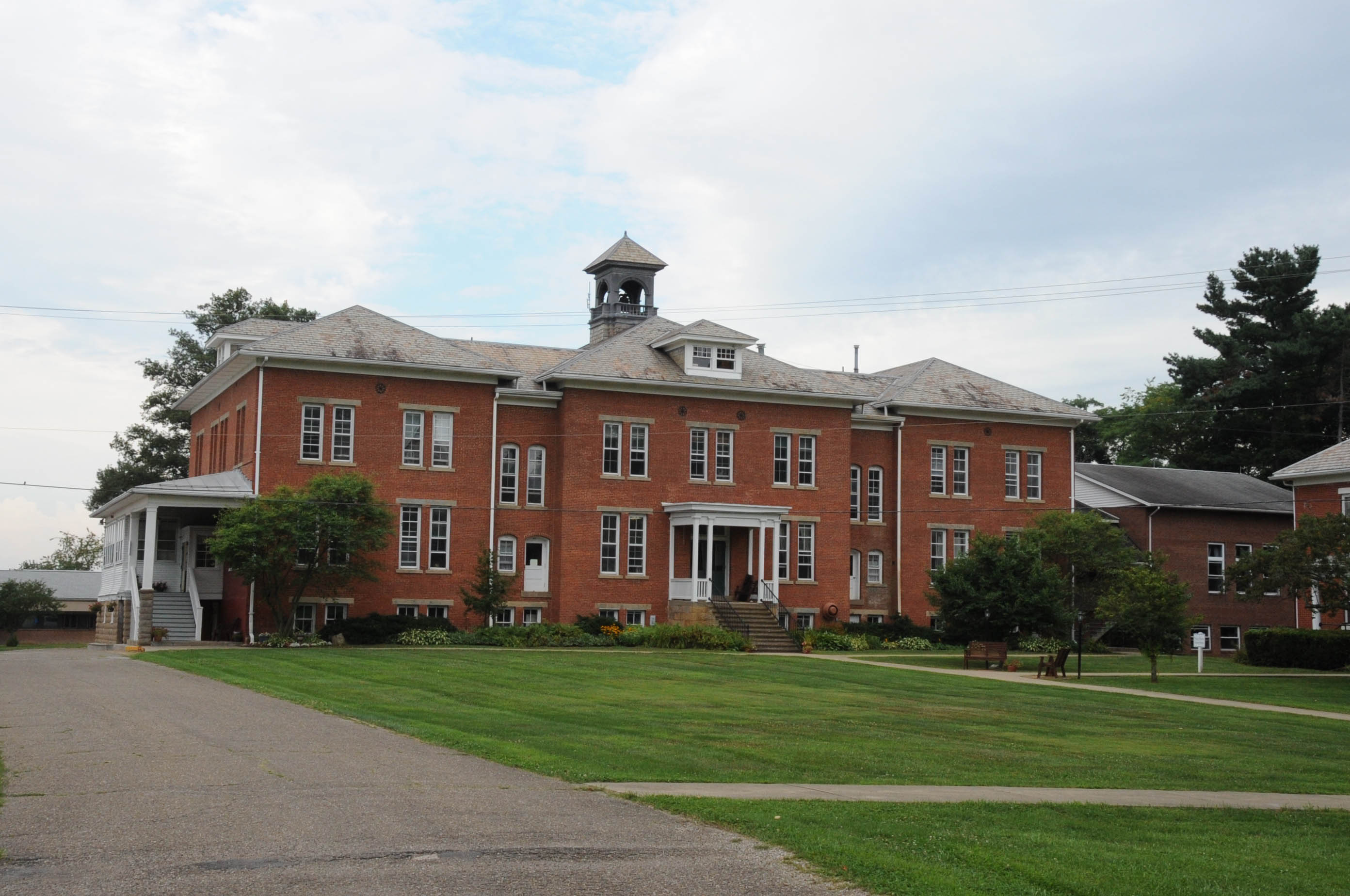
Main building

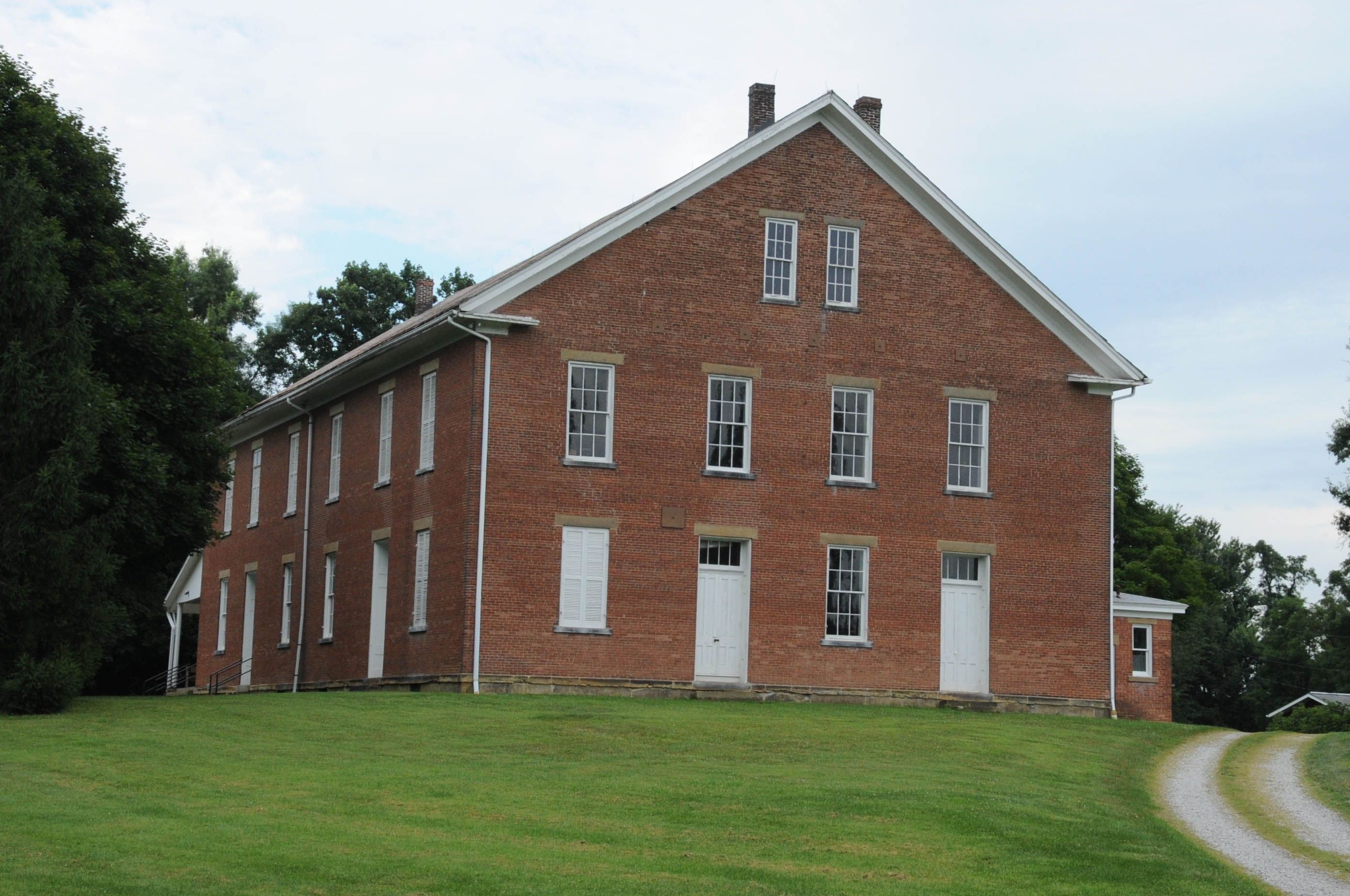
Meetinghouse on campus

Olney Friends School has enjoyed over 150 years of success in the field of educating young men and women. The school was founded in 1837 by the Ohio Yearly Meeting of the Religious Society of Friends (Quakers). As early as 1814, this group of newly settled Ohio Quakers began plans for a boarding school for both boys and girls, which was to be modeled on Quaker boarding schools in Philadelphia. Finally, in 1835, the building of the school commenced and was opened for students two years later. This early school, which was simply known as the Friends Boarding School, was located at Mount Pleasant, Ohio, northeast of its current location. The name "Olney" was informally adopted from a poem entitled "Olney Green," written by Louis Taber, a visiting minister from Vermont and teacher at the school in the 1840s.

In 1854 there was a division in Ohio Yearly Meeting, the principal organizing body of Ohio Quaker Meeting groups, over doctrinal differences. The division occurred between two groups that had differing visions for the future of Ohio Yearly Meeting. Eventually the Ohio Supreme Court awarded the original school building to the "Gurney" group of Quakers in 1874. The other group, known as the "Wilburite" Quakers built a new school building at the present Barnesville location in 1876.

In March 1910, Olney's main building was gutted by a fire that started in its belfry burned to the ground, leaving only the outer brick walls and the front porch. Although the building had housed the classrooms, the student living quarters and the dining area, the class of 1910 remained through the year to graduate on time thanks to local families who opened their homes. The main building was rebuilt and separate boys and girls dormitories were added. Even before the buildings were completed, the students moved back into their new school in November, 1910. The gymnasium was added in 1938; a new girls dormitory was built in 1967.

While Olney Friends School originally only served students from Quaker families, by the 1960s students from a variety of religious, cultural, and geographic backgrounds began attending the school. In 1978 the school's official name was changed to Olney Friends School. In 1998 Ohio Yearly Meeting decided to end its governance of the school due to low enrollment and increasing financial burden. A group of individuals, mostly Olney Friends School alumni concerned for the continuance of the school, formed a new corporation: Friends of Olney, Inc. After much deliberation Ohio Yearly Meeting agreed to turn over the management of the school to this group and negotiated a lease for the use of the school property, about 350 acres, including the farm. When the transition was completed a board of trustees began operating the institution as an independent Quaker school no longer under the care of a Friends Meeting. The former name, Olney Friends School Inc., was legally transferred and continues to provide a sense of continuity based on the school's Quaker roots. In late June 2004 an agreement for the purchase of the main campus property from Ohio Yearly Meeting was successfully negotiated, while the farm land continuing to be leased.

Today, Olney Friends School's 35-40 students come from diverse international, religious, social and economic backgrounds. In the 21st century, Olney Friends School is chartered by the Ohio State Department of Education and is accredited by the Independent Schools Association of the Central States. Olney Friends School also holds memberships in the Ohio Association of Independent Schools, Midwest Boarding Schools, the School Scholarship Service, Friends Council on Education, the Association of Boarding Schools, and the National Association of Independent Schools.

In 2015 the school received its USDA Certificate, making it the U.S.'s first USDA Certified Organic high school.

The school and meetinghouse were added as a historic district to the National Register on 2009-03-25

== Notable alumni ==
- Louis J. Taber 1912, first Ohio Director of Agriculture, 1921–1923; Master of National Grange, 1923–1941
- C. Lloyd Bailey 1935, President of the U.S.Committee for UNICEF, leader in Quaker education and peace concerns including Friends Committee on National Legislation
- Wilmer Cooper 1938, author, Founding Dean at Earlham School of Religion
- Chris Dickerson 1957, bodybuilder and opera singer, first African-American Mr. America, and oldest Mr. Olympia (won at 43)
- Patricia Altschul c. 1960, socialite, actress, and art collector
- Faith Morgan 1970, Executive Director, Arthur Morgan Institute for Community Solutions; director of film The Power of Community: How Cuba Survived Peak Oil
- Shira Tarrant 1981, author and lecturer on gender and sexual politics, pop culture, and masculinity
- Alix Generous 2010, neuroscientist, mental health activist, and writer

== Notable faculty ==
- Howard Brinton, author, professor, and administrator of Friends institutions including Pendle Hill
