= Barnesville Pumpkin Festival =

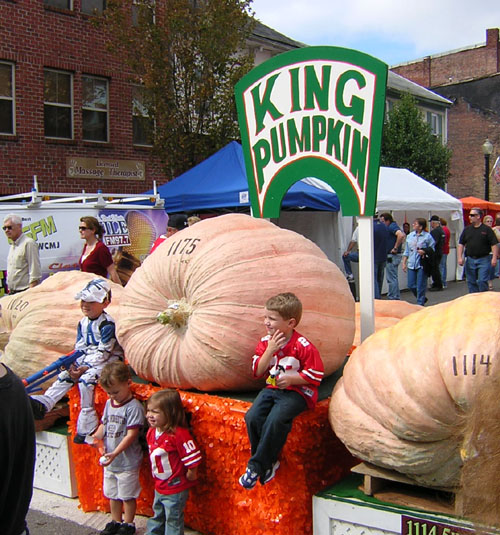
- King Pumpkin of the Barnesville Pumpkin Festival in 2008
- Status: active
- Genre: food festivals
- Frequency: Annually, last full week of September
- Location: Barnesville, Ohio
- Coordinates: 39°59′17″N 81°10′39″W
- Country: United States
- Years active: 61–62
- Inaugurated: 1964
- Website: www.barnesvillepumpkinfestival.com

The Barnesville Pumpkin Festival is an annual festival in Barnesville, Ohio, dedicated to the growing and harvesting of pumpkins and other fall harvests. The festival, which has been held since 1964, is conducted by a locally appointed committee and attracts an average of 100,000 people during the 4-day event.

== Dates ==
The Pumpkin Festival is held the last full week in September. The official ribbon cutting is held on Thursday, but the local citizens are encouraged to preview the festival on Wednesday.

== Locations ==
The Pumpkin Festival begins preparations the Monday before the festival and restricted areas are placed from the center of town at the junction of Chestnut Street and Main Street, west along Main Street to the junction of Main Street and Gardner Street; and from where W. Church Street and N. Broadway Street meet, south to the junction of South Broadway and South Street. This however only comprises the downtown section, several other events and locations dot the town. There is abundant parking, but most is private and requires a parking and safety fee.

== History ==
The Barnesville Pumpkin Festival began in 1964 as the Ohio Fall Festival and was held in the basement of the Church of the Assumption. The name changed to the Ohio Pumpkin Festival and the event was held out of doors in the center of town in the 1970s and changed to the Barnesville Pumpkin Festival later that same decade. The Pumpkin Festival has always been held the last full weekend in September, with 2020 being the lone exception due to the COVID-19 pandemic; however, the King Pumpkin Weigh-in went on.

== Traditions ==
The Barnesville Pumpkin Festival holds its annual weigh-in on the Wednesday preceding the event. The event has seen pumpkins with weights breaking and matching state and local records. The King Pumpkin contenders are too heavy to be weighed on a conventional scale, weighing in at over 650 kg (1400 lbs), and thus a local funeral home scale is used. The official ribbon cutting is held the following day and is done by either the committee president, city mayor, parade marshal or other notable local figure. The Annual Pumpkin Auction is held on the last day, Sunday, where the local business compete bids to display the winning pumpkin and sell off the seeds as they see fit.

The Olney Friends School is famous for bringing over 700 loaves of pumpkin bread to sell from their booth, baked by the students.

There are many games, rides, and other activities set up during the festival. Some of the usual rides are the G-Force, The Pumpkin Ride, The Umbrellas, and the Monkey Cages.

== See also ==
- Circleville Pumpkin Show

== Gallery ==
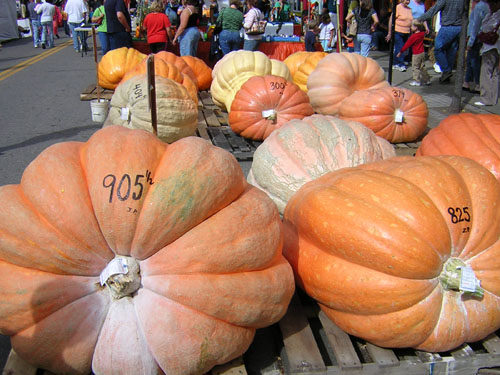

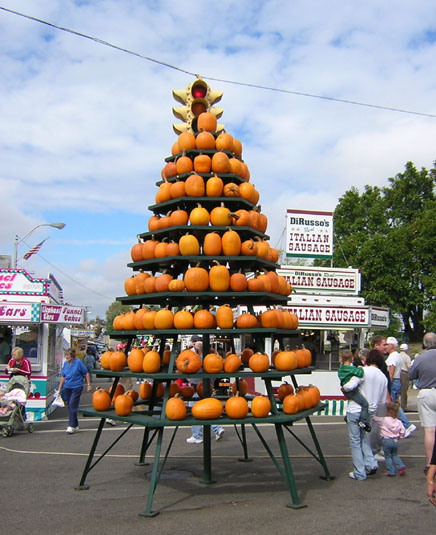
