= Circleville Pumpkin Show =

Annual festival in Ohio, U.S.

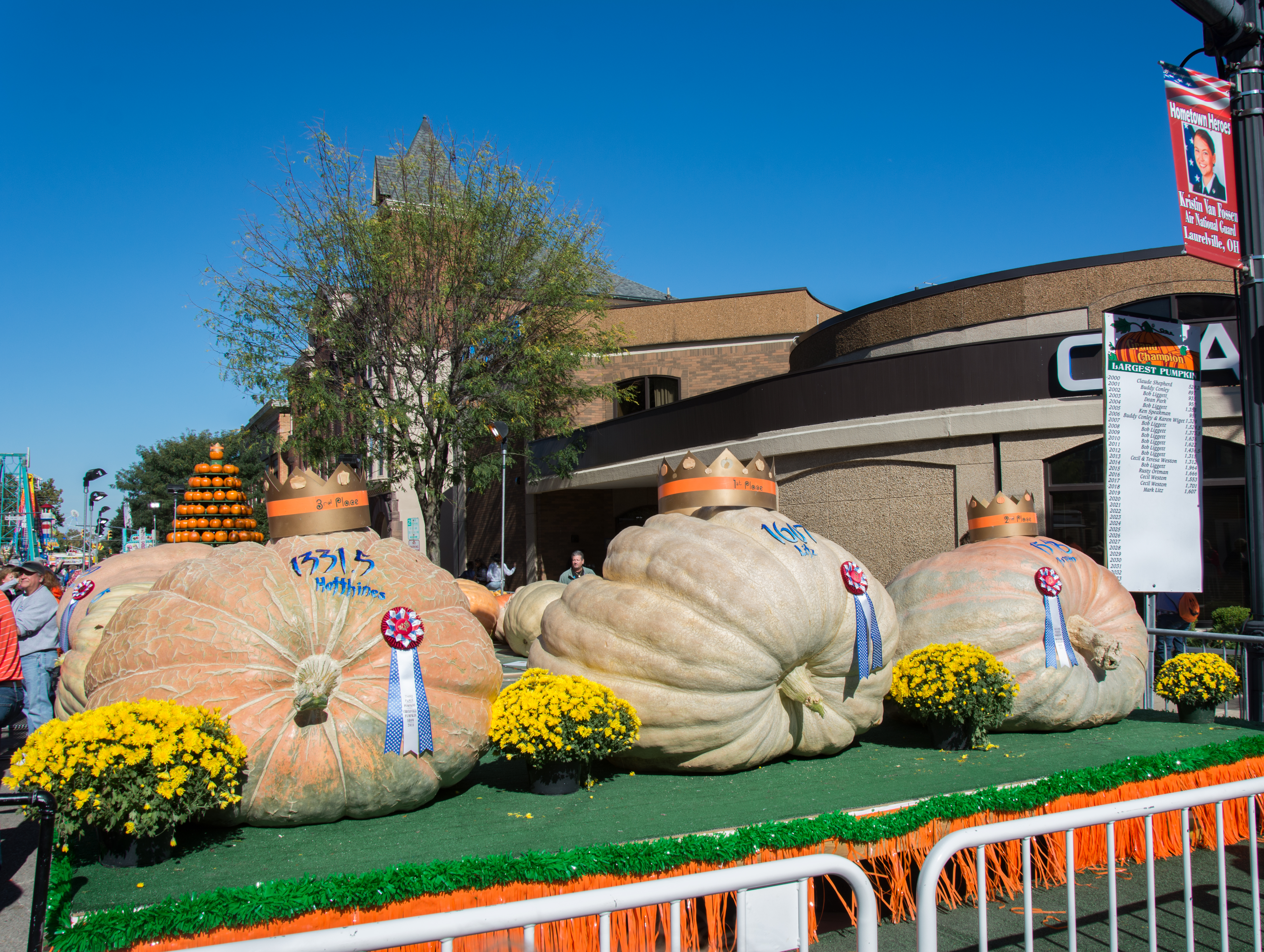
- Prize-winning pumpkins in 2018, with their weights in pounds written on them
- Status: Active
- Genre: Festivals
- Frequency: Annually
- Venue: Street
- Location: Circleville, Ohio
- Coordinates: 39°36′07″N 82°56′42″W
- Country: United States
- Years active: 122–123
- Inaugurated: October 1903
- Website: www.pumpkinshow.com

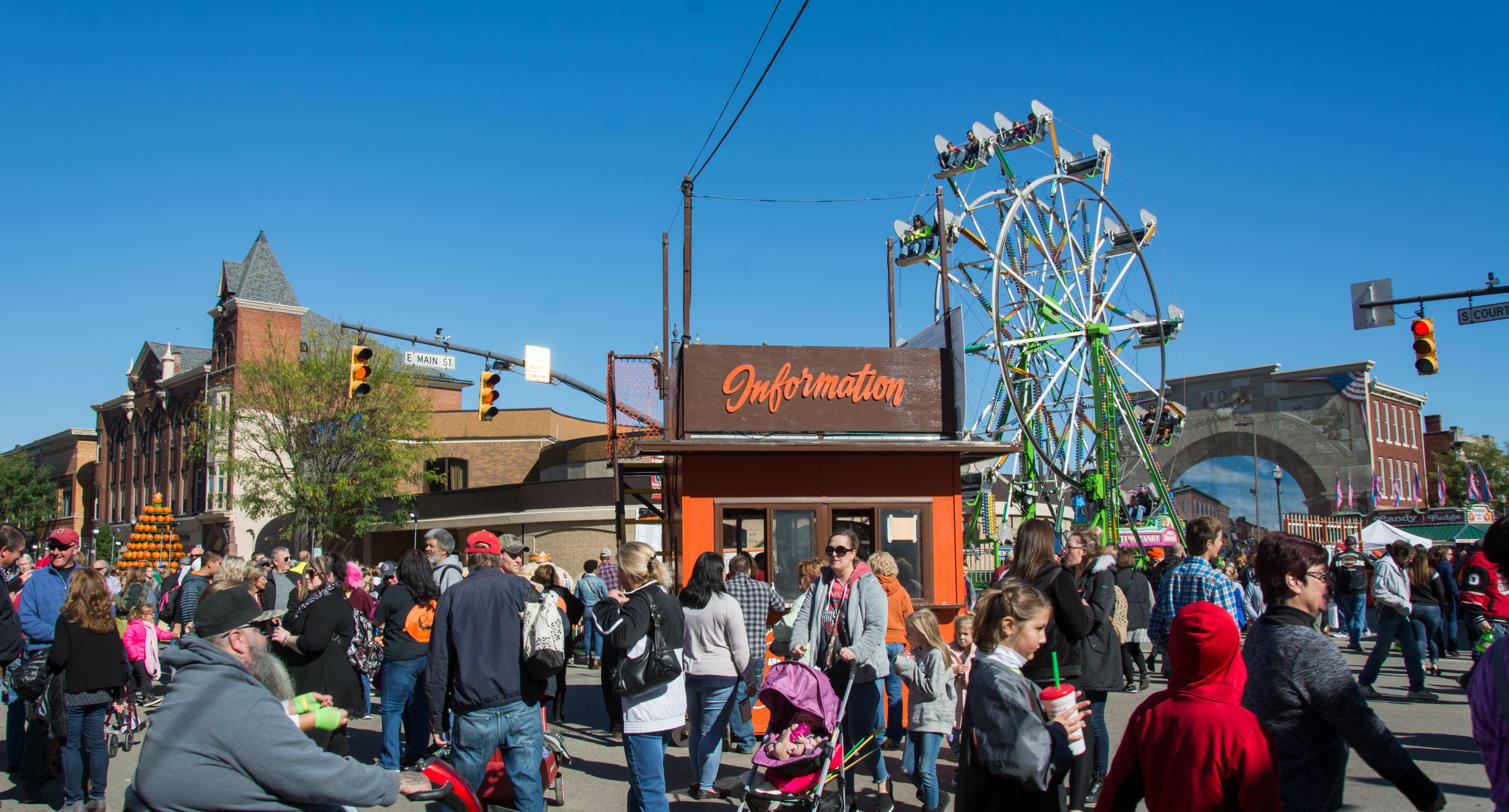
The Circleville Pumpkin Show

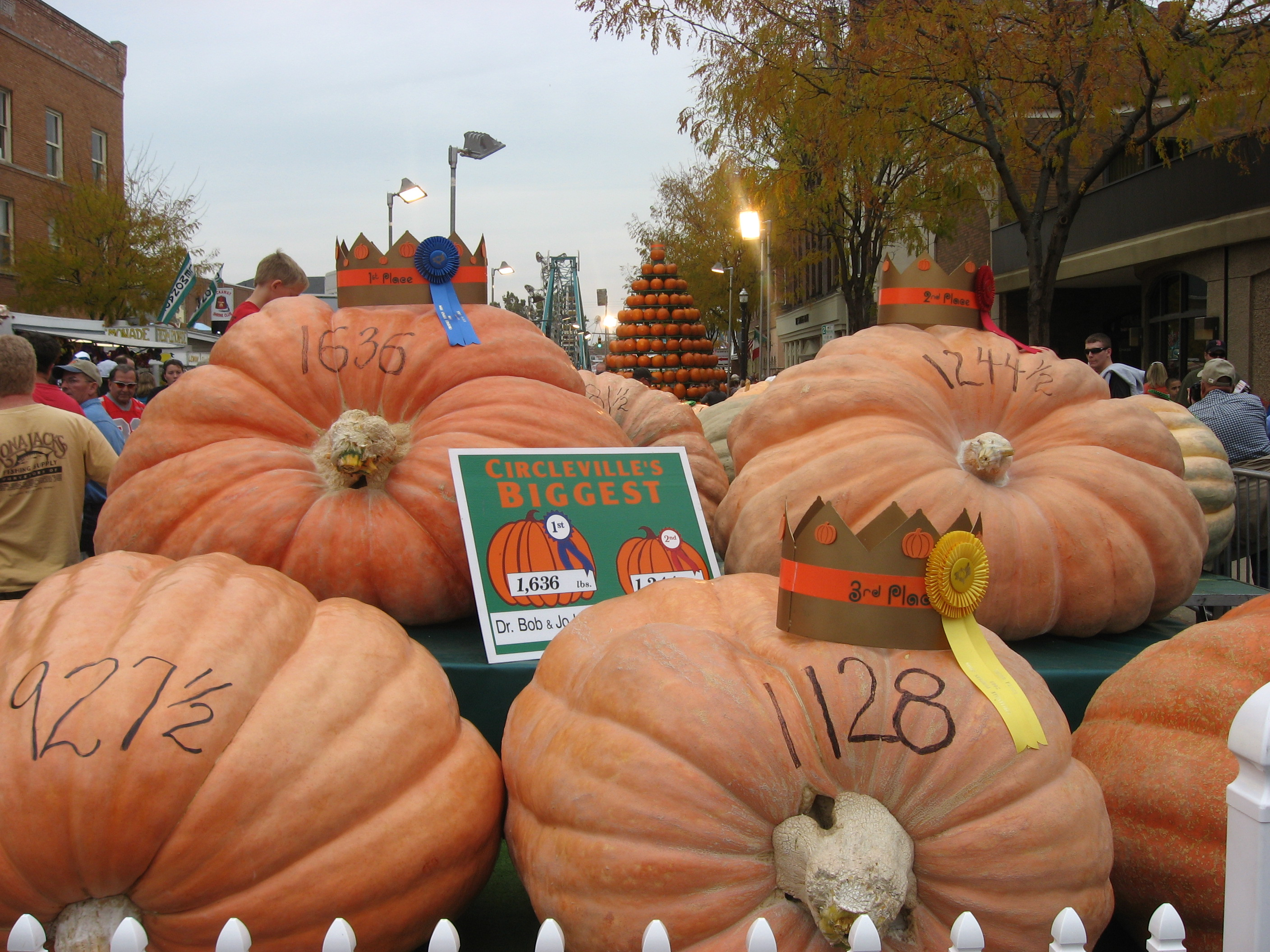
2009 champion pumpkins

The Circleville Pumpkin Show is an annual show held in Circleville, Ohio, about 30 miles (48 km) south of the state capital of Columbus. The festival, which is held to celebrate local agriculture, is headed up by the Circleville Pumpkin Show Corporation. Considered to be the biggest festival in the United States dedicated to the pumpkin, it is billed as The Greatest Free Show On Earth. Attendance has topped 400,000 for the four-day event, which is free to enter.

== Dates ==
The Pumpkin Show begins on the third Wednesday of October and lasts until the following Saturday. In recent years, a Tuesday preview night "for locals" has been introduced, adding an unofficial half day to the event.

== Locations ==
Starting on the Sunday before the festival, work begins to restrict traffic in downtown Circleville. The restricted areas dedicated to the show are from South Scioto Street on the west to Pickaway Street on the east, and Watt/Pinckney Street on the north to Franklin Street on the south. More than 12 blocks are restricted by this event, which causes massive detours throughout a major portion of the city, including State Route 56 and U.S. Route 22. Because there is no organized parking system, many small businesses, individuals, and non-profit organizations provide parking for varying fees.

== History ==
In October 1903, Mayor George R. Haswell decided to hold a small pumpkin-and-corn exhibit in front of his store to celebrate the local harvest. This small exhibit featured corn, carved pumpkins and other harvest-themed displays. Because of the prominence of pumpkins in this first exhibit, the name "The Pumpkin Show" was then coined. In the following years local merchants were attracted to improve the size, scope and attendance of the festival. By 1905, the first ride was installed. Soon after, with the success of the shows, an annual festival was organized to be held on the city streets to attract merchants, patrons and improve the quality of the festival.

The Pumpkin Show has been held annually since 1903. Despite it still being held during the influenza outbreaks of 1918–1919, the Pumpkin Show was stopped for one year during World War I, two years during World War II, and in 2020 due to the COVID-19 pandemic.

The Pumpkin Show became the sixth-largest festival in the United States by 2007, attracting more than 300,000 people to the city every year.

== Traditions ==
Every Pumpkin Show officially kicks off with the weigh-in of large pumpkins from around the area. The largest pumpkin to date was grown by Bob & Jo Liggett, with their entry from 2023 weighing in at 2,388.5 pounds (1,083.4 kg). It is the current Ohio state record holder. Recent weigh-ins have had multiple entries that go over 1,000 pounds (450 kg).

Every year, Lindsey's Bakery creates the "world's largest" pumpkin pie. Visitors can be in line for over an hour to see the pie. At the 100th anniversary Pumpkin Show in 2006, the bakery had to make a much bigger pie compared to previous years to officially reclaim the title of world's largest. The pie pan was so large that it was moved outside of the bakery window and into a tent out on the street.

Another long-standing tradition of the Circleville Pumpkin Show is a pageant to crown the Little Miss and Miss Pumpkin Show Queen. The Little Miss Pumpkin Show Queen must be in the 2nd grade at a school in Pickaway County, while the Miss Pumpkin Show Queen must be a junior from one of the seven local high schools. Once crowned, they lead off each parade for the rest of the event.

Seven parades in total are held during the event (two on Wednesday-Friday, one night parade on Saturday). These parades have many different themes, including the Pet Parade and Baby Parade. These parades also feature performances by many local high school and middle school bands, as well as other organizations. The Ohio University Marching 110, which is often referred to as "The Most Exciting Band In The Land," has made numerous trips to highlight Thursday night's parade of bands. The 2006 Pumpkin Show welcomed The Ohio State University Marching Band. They came back in 2010 to march in the parade of bands again and hold a concert afterwards. They most recently performed at the Pumpkin Show in 2021.

== Facts ==
The Pumpkin Show features several different pumpkin related foods, including pumpkin donuts, pancakes, burgers, ice cream, cookies, fudge, brownies, cream puffs, waffles, pumpkin seeds, and pumpkin pie. Over the course of the event, approximately 23,000 pumpkin pies and more than 100,000 pumpkin donuts are sold from local vendors. There are also many other festival foods available at various stands throughout the event.

Due to its popularity, the Pumpkin Show also has a song, "The Punkin Show," written and composed by M. W. "Burk" Burkhart in 1952 (published in 1977).

People from over 34 states and 13 different countries have been documented to have attended the festival in the most recent years.
