= National Register of Historic Places listings in Belmont County, Ohio =

Location of Belmont County in Ohio

This is a list of the National Register of Historic Places listings in Belmont County, Ohio.

This is intended to be a complete list of the properties and districts on the National Register of Historic Places in Belmont County, Ohio, United States. The locations of National Register properties and districts for which the latitude and longitude coordinates are included below, may be seen in an online map.

There are 29 properties and districts listed on the National Register in the county, including 1 National Historic Landmark. Another property was once listed but has been removed.

This National Park Service list is complete through NPS recent listings posted December 12, 2025.

== Current listings ==
	Name on the Register	Image	Date listed	Location	City or town	Description
1	B & O Railroad Viaduct	B & O Railroad Viaduct	June 22, 1976 (#76001370)	31st St. 40°00′47″N 80°44′40″W	Bellaire	Extends into Benwood in Marshall County, West Virginia
2	Barnesville Baltimore and Ohio Railroad Depot	Barnesville Baltimore and Ohio Railroad Depot	August 8, 1985 (#85001694)	300 E. Church St. 39°59′19″N 81°10′24″W	Barnesville	
3	Barnesville Historic District	Barnesville Historic District	July 19, 1984 (#84002899)	Roughly bounded by Arch, Main, Gardner, Chestnut, Bond, and Cherry Sts. 39°59′16″N 81°10′38″W	Barnesville	
4	Barnesville Petroglyph	Barnesville Petroglyph	July 15, 1974 (#74001400)	Off Track Rocks Road, southwest of Barnesville; 39°58′45″N 81°13′54″W	Warren Township	
5	Belleview Heights	Belleview Heights	April 8, 1994 (#94000259)	65100 Candlewick Ln. 40°01′41″N 80°44′37″W	Bellaire	
6	Belmont Historic District	Belmont Historic District	March 13, 1987 (#87000422)	Roughly bounded by Barrister, John, Jefferson, Sycamore, and Bridge Sts. 40°01′46″N 81°02′25″W	Belmont	
7	Blaine Hill "S" Bridge	Blaine Hill "S" Bridge	March 17, 2010 (#10000082)	Township Road 649 at Blaine; 40°04′01″N 80°49′15″W	Pease Township	385-foot-long (117 m) bridge with three stone arches; built in 1828; oldest standing bridge in Ohio
8	Brick Tavern House	Brick Tavern House	November 22, 1995 (#95001330)	U.S. Route 40 west of St. Clairsville; 40°04′25″N 80°58′58″W	Richland Township	
9	Brokaw Site	Brokaw Site	June 17, 1976 (#76001371)	Off Brokaw Dr., southwest of St. Clairsville; 40°04′04″N 80°55′56″W	Richland Township	
10	Concord Hicksite Friends Meeting House	Concord Hicksite Friends Meeting House	July 23, 2009 (#09000562)	Negus Rd. 40°07′31″N 80°47′45″W	Colerain Township	
11	DONALD B (towboat)	DONALD B (towboat)	December 20, 1989 (#89002458)	Ohio River; 40°01′16″N 80°44′17″W	Bellaire	
12	Epworth Park Historic District	Epworth Park Historic District	July 15, 2025 (#100012004)	215 N. Main Street; 40°01′07″N 81°04′33″W	Bethesda	
13	Finney-Darrah House	Finney-Darrah House	March 15, 1982 (#82003546)	Scenery Hill; 40°06′02″N 80°44′22″W	Martins Ferry	
14	Friends Boarding School and Ohio Yearly Meetinghouse Historic District	Friends Boarding School and Ohio Yearly Meetinghouse Historic District	March 25, 2009 (#09000168)	61830 Sandy Ridge Rd., east of Barnesville; 39°59′18″N 81°09′09″W	Warren Township	
15	Thomas T. and Wesley B. Frasier Houses	Thomas T. and Wesley B. Frasier Houses	November 17, 1982 (#82001359)	898 and 920 National Rd. 40°04′15″N 80°45′35″W	Brookside	
16	George-Caldwell-Grum Farm	George-Caldwell-Grum Farm	February 14, 2018 (#100002118)	68895 Lloydsville-Bannock Road; 40°05′18″N 80°59′01″W	Richland Township	
17	Great Western Schoolhouse	Great Western Schoolhouse	May 7, 1979 (#79001787)	West of St. Clairsville on U.S. Route 40; 40°04′22″N 80°58′52″W	Richland Township	
18	Imperial Glass Company	Imperial Glass Company	September 8, 1983 (#83001945)	29th and Belmont Sts. 40°00′41″N 80°44′49″W	Bellaire	
19	James Kinney Farmstead	James Kinney Farmstead	April 29, 1999 (#99000510)	44680 Belmont-Centerville Rd., southeast of Belmont; 39°59′50″N 80°59′38″W	Smith Township	
20	Joseph Kirkwood House	Joseph Kirkwood House	February 13, 1986 (#86000239)	329 Bennett St. 40°04′08″N 80°44′39″W	Bridgeport	
21	Morristown Historic District	Morristown Historic District	March 6, 1980 (#80002943)	Church, Main, W. Cross, E. Cross, and Middle Cross Sts. 40°03′51″N 81°04′22″W	Morristown	
22	Opatrny Village Site	Opatrny Village Site	May 21, 1975 (#75001323)	U.S. Route 40 north of the Belmont Hills Country Club; 40°04′29″N 80°56′36″W	Richland Township	
23	Rock Hill Presbyterian Church	Rock Hill Presbyterian Church	April 1, 2009 (#09000169)	56244 High Ridge Rd., northwest of Bellaire; 40°02′15″N 80°46′22″W	Pultney Township	
24	St. Clairsville Historic District	St. Clairsville Historic District	March 17, 1994 (#94000246)	E. and W. Main St. between Butler and Sugar Sts. 40°04′50″N 80°54′02″W	St. Clairsville	
25	Dr. Lindley Schooley House and Office	Dr. Lindley Schooley House and Office	April 1, 1982 (#82003545)	Main St. 40°01′45″N 81°02′31″W	Belmont	
26	Stratton Flour Mill		April 26, 2024 (#100010231)	110 Mill Road; 40°08′44″N 81°03′50″W	Flushing	
27	Tower Site	Tower Site	June 11, 1982 (#82003544)	On a hilltop 4 miles northwest of Barnesville; 40°01′23″N 81°13′16″W	Warren Township	
28	Wheeling Island Historic District	Wheeling Island Historic District	April 2, 1992 (#92000320)	Roughly bounded by Stone, Front, North, Ontario, Erie, and Wabash Sts. 40°04′50″N 80°44′15″W	Bridgeport	Primarily located in Ohio County, West Virginia, but includes the Aetnaville Bridge, which is partially in Ohio
29	Zweig Building	Zweig Building	January 28, 2000 (#00000018)	3396 Belmont St. 40°01′07″N 80°44′32″W	Bellaire	

== Former listing ==
	Name on the Register	Image	Date listed	Date removed	Location	City or town	Description
1	Central School	Central School	May 7, 1979 (#79001786)	February 21, 1980	Junction of Hickory and S. 4th Streets; 40°05′41″N 80°43′31″W	Martins Ferry	Destroyed

== See also ==
- List of National Historic Landmarks in Ohio
- Listings in neighboring counties: Guernsey, Harrison, Jefferson, Marshall (WV), Monroe, Noble, Ohio (WV)
- National Register of Historic Places listings in Ohio
