= Barnesville Petroglyph =

Archaeological site in Ohio, United States

- U.S. National Register of Historic Places
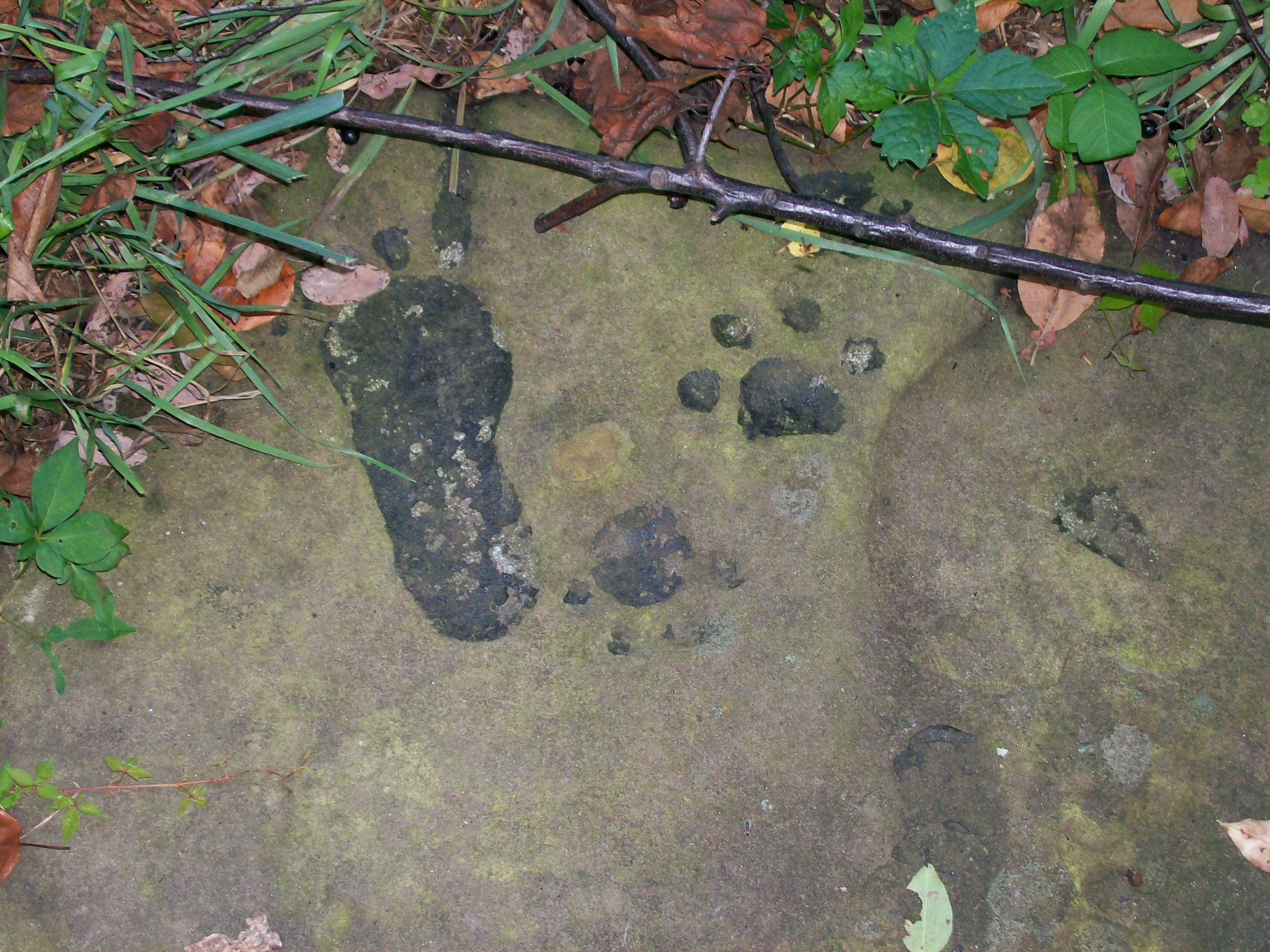
- Human footprints at the site, outlined in charcoal

- Location within Ohio Location within the United States
- Location: Off Track Rocks Road, southwest of Barnesville
- Nearest city: Barnesville, Ohio
- Coordinates: 39°58′45″N 81°13′54″W
- Area: 3 acres (1.2 ha)
- NRHP reference No.: 74001400
- Added to NRHP: July 15, 1974

The Barnesville Petroglyph petroglyph site in the eastern part of the U.S. state of Ohio. Located approximately 3 miles (4.8 km) southwest of the village of Barnesville in Belmont County, the petroglyphs have been known both by archaeologists and the general public since the 1850s or earlier. Although the site was significantly damaged during the twentieth century, it is still a significant archaeological site, and has been named a historic site.

== Creation ==
The Barnesville Petroglyph carvings were created centuries ago by Native American people. The precise cultural affiliation of its creators is uncertain. Some have attributed the site to the Adena, who inhabited the region approximately between 500 BC and AD 300. However, Barnesville shares many similarities with other petroglyph sites in western Pennsylvania, northern West Virginia, and other parts of eastern Ohio; as a result, petroglyph specialist James L. Swauger concluded that it was the work of the people that also created such sites as the Indian God Rock, the Sugar Grove Petroglyphs, and the Hamilton Farm Petroglyphs. Many features of these and similar petroglyph sites in the region indicated to Swauger that they were created by Ojibwe-influenced people of the Monongahela culture, whose earliest presence in the Upper Ohio Valley is believed to have been approximately AD 1200.

== Geology ==
The petroglyphs are carved into a single large boulder of Dunkard-series sandstone that sits in woodland atop a hill with an elevation of approximately 1,320 feet (400 m). Measuring approximately 3.5 metres (11 ft) from east to west and 4.5 metres (15 ft) from northwest to southeast, the boulder slopes from end to end: the northwestern corner is nearly 1 metre (3 ft 3 in) above the soil, but the southeastern corner gradually meets ground level. Dozens of boulders of Dunkard sandstone, both small and large, are littered around the hilltop; but only two presently bear any sort of human carvings.

== Petroglyphs ==
When the site was first recorded archaeologically, carvings were scattered among several different boulders on the hilltop. At least one such stone has been removed: during the early twentieth century, a group of men masquerading as staff from a museum obtained the second-largest boulder, and it has been lost to science as a result. Smaller rocks were also recorded with petroglyphs, but a 1971 professional survey failed to find anything except on the largest boulder. At that time, it was believed that the other stones may have been stolen, become undistinguishable due to weathering, or simply have become lost among the many similar boulders. Four years later, the second boulder was re-discovered; the previous survey missed it because it had been buried or otherwise obscured.

The large boulder of premier interest bears 113 different designs, which have been divided into 6 different classifications: 47 mammal imprints (the tracks of bears and deer, plus indeterminate paw prints and the outlines of animal pelts), 26 bird tracks, 21 human body parts (5 faces and 16 feet), 12 geometric figures, 4 snakes, and 3 pits. While the precise identification of the animals whose prints are carved at the stone are uncertain, these designations were applied because they were seen to be the animals most likely to be encountered by the Native Americans who produced the petroglyph. Similar to carvings at another site that are known as "nut-cracker holes," the pits are small indentations that are most likely to have been made individually, although it is possible that they are the sole surviving elements of otherwise eroded designs. It is very difficult to identify the types of animals whose prints are represented by the smaller tracks: a specialist in mammals from the Carnegie Museum of Natural History was unable to determine whether many of them were meant to be the prints of dogs or of cats. Most unusual of the designs are the pelts and the human faces: only one other petroglyph site in the Upper Ohio Valley has designs that appear to be stretched-out animal skins, and the noses featured on some of the human faces are almost unknown at other petroglyphs in the region. Those carvings designated as "geometric" are mostly abstract designs; common on Native American petroglyph sites in the region, such "doodles" are thought to be likely evidence that many different sites were created by people of the same culture.

Carvings at Barnesville are noticeably different from those at Belmont County's other significant petroglyph site: known as Barton Rock, this site consists of petroglyphs on a large boulder in the middle of Wheeling Creek, approximately 0.7 miles (1.1 km) below the unincorporated community of Barton. First described in 2002, Barton Rock consists primarily of images of turtles and birds. Such a concentration is similar to the many riverine petroglyph sites in the Ohio Valley that Swauger described, while Barnesville's large number of tracks is similar to many other upland sites in the region.

== Recognition ==
The earliest published record of the Barnesville Petroglyph was created in 1857 or 1858 by Thomas Kite, and a similar description was produced soon afterward by James W. Ward. Drawing on these works, Charles Wittlesey and J.H. Salisbury produced a more systematic description in 1869 and 1871: published in 1872, they describe the carvings present on the boulder that was once thought to have been removed from the site as well as documenting the carvings that have always been known. A yet fuller description was included in James L. Swauger's landmark Rock Art of the Upper Ohio Valley, which was published in 1972. Because of the dominance of footprints among the rest of the types of carvings, the petroglyph has become popularly known as the "Track Rocks" among local residents; nicknames of this sort are common for better-known petroglyphs, as exemplified by the "Picture Rocks" appellation of Pennsylvania's Sugar Grove Petroglyphs.

Besides the carvings themselves, the petroglyph's immediate vicinity is archaeologically important because of the presence of many smaller archaeological artifacts. Various types of projectile points have been found nearby; most were produced by the Adena or various Late Archaic peoples. Moreover, the nearby Shannon Cave is believed to have archaeological value, and it has been proposed that some of the petroglyph carvings are meant to point toward the cave. As a prominent archaeological site, the Barnesville Petroglyph was listed on the National Register of Historic Places in 1974. It is one of four National Register-listed archaeological sites in the county, along with the Brokaw, Opatrny Village, and Tower Sites, which are all the locations of Monongahela villages. Only two other Ohio petroglyphs are included on the Register; known as the Leo Petroglyph State Memorial and Inscription Rock, they are located respectively in Jackson County in the far southern portion of the state and on Kelleys Island in Lake Erie, north of the state's mainland.
