= Concord Hicksite Friends Meeting House =

- U.S. National Register of Historic Places
- U.S. Historic district
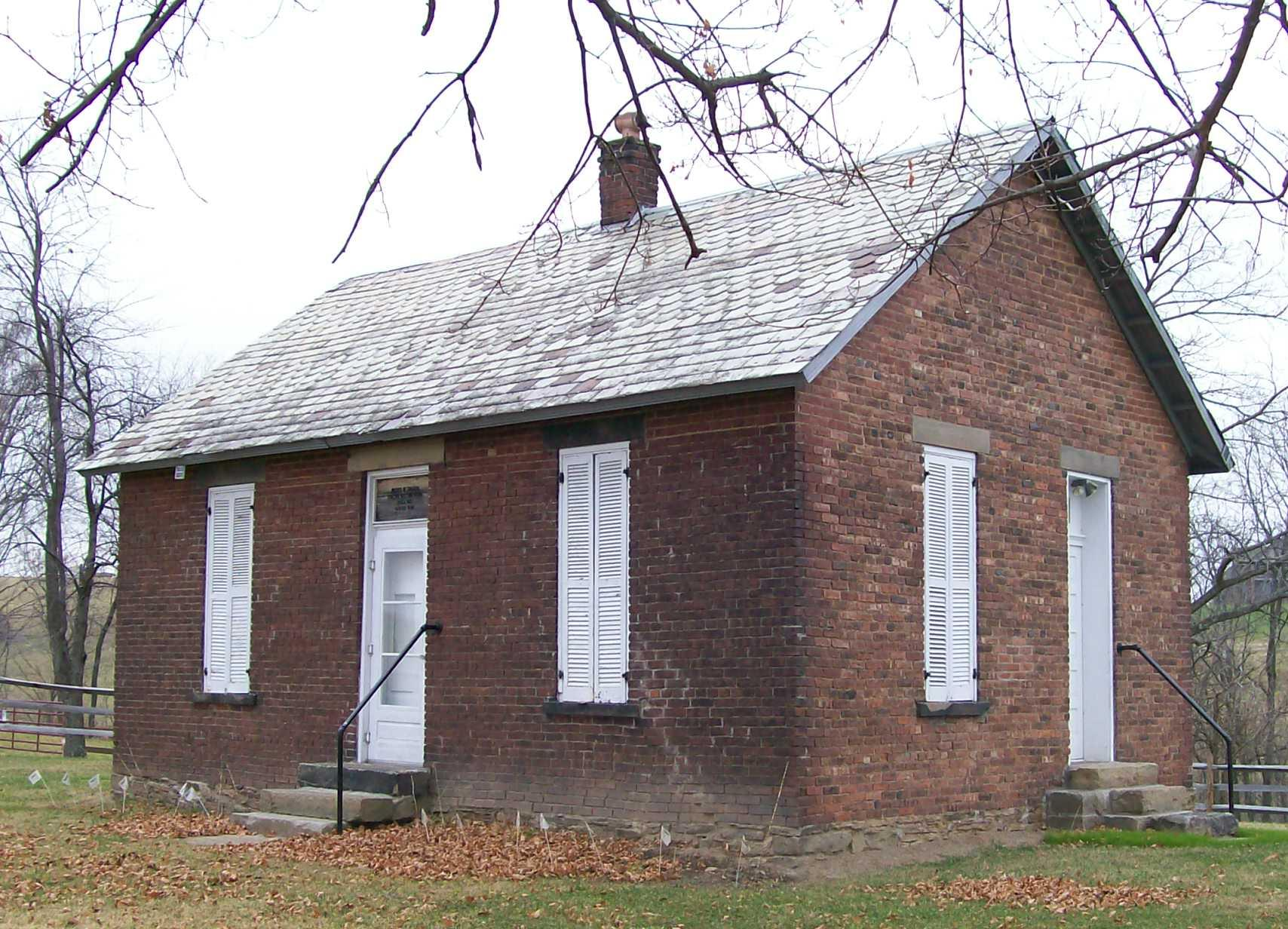
- Front and side of the meeting house

- Location within Ohio Location within the United States
- Location: Negus Rd., Colerain Township, Belmont County, Ohio
- Coordinates: 40°7′29″N 80°47′43″W
- Area: 1 acre (0.40 ha)
- Built: 1815
- NRHP reference No.: 09000562
- Added to NRHP: July 23, 2009

The Concord Hicksite Friends Meeting House is a historic Friends meeting house located near the community of Colerain, Ohio, United States. Constructed in 1815 for a group formed in 1801, it has been named a historic site.

Founded as "Concord", Colerain was the second community to be founded in present-day Belmont County. The founders were Friends who emigrated largely from North Carolina and Virginia to escape slavery. The first monthly meeting at Concord was held on December 19, 1801, but in the early years, its locations varied from the vicinity of Wheeling, the nearby Short Creek, and Plainfield in Coshocton County. Until Miami Monthly Meeting was established in 1803, many Friends settling in southwestern Ohio were members at Concord. Other members left around the same time to form a separate monthly meeting, Stillwater, in Warren Township. By the late nineteenth century, this settlement had grown to the point that it had become the permanent meeting place of Ohio Yearly Meeting. Both Concord and Stillwater suffered division in 1828, as the Hicksite controversy saw the secession of individuals following Hicks' new teachings. Concord was particularly deeply involved in spreading innovation in Ohio Yearly Meeting, and the quarterly meeting having oversight of Concord was forced to appoint a committee to visit its other monthly meetings to check the spread of dissension. Virtually none of the members remained in communion with Orthodox meetings, and from the Orthodox perspective, the meeting was quickly laid down, i.e. disorganized.

Constructed in 1815, the Concord meeting house is a simple brick building with no architectural style; the foundation is stone, and slates cover the roof. The structure is a basic rectangle, with doors on both long and short sides; one window pierces the end, and two shuttered windows (one on either side of the doorway) pierce the front. The end rises to a gable, and a small chimney sits atop the peak of the roof. Transom lights are placed above the entrances, which sit atop small flights of steps that rise from a footpath that runs around the building.

In 2009, the Concord meeting house was listed on the National Register of Historic Places, qualifying both because of its place in local history and because of its historically significant architecture. It is Colerain Township's only National Register-listed site, and one of twenty-six countywide.
