= Joseph Kirkwood House =

Historic house in Ohio, United States

- U.S. National Register of Historic Places
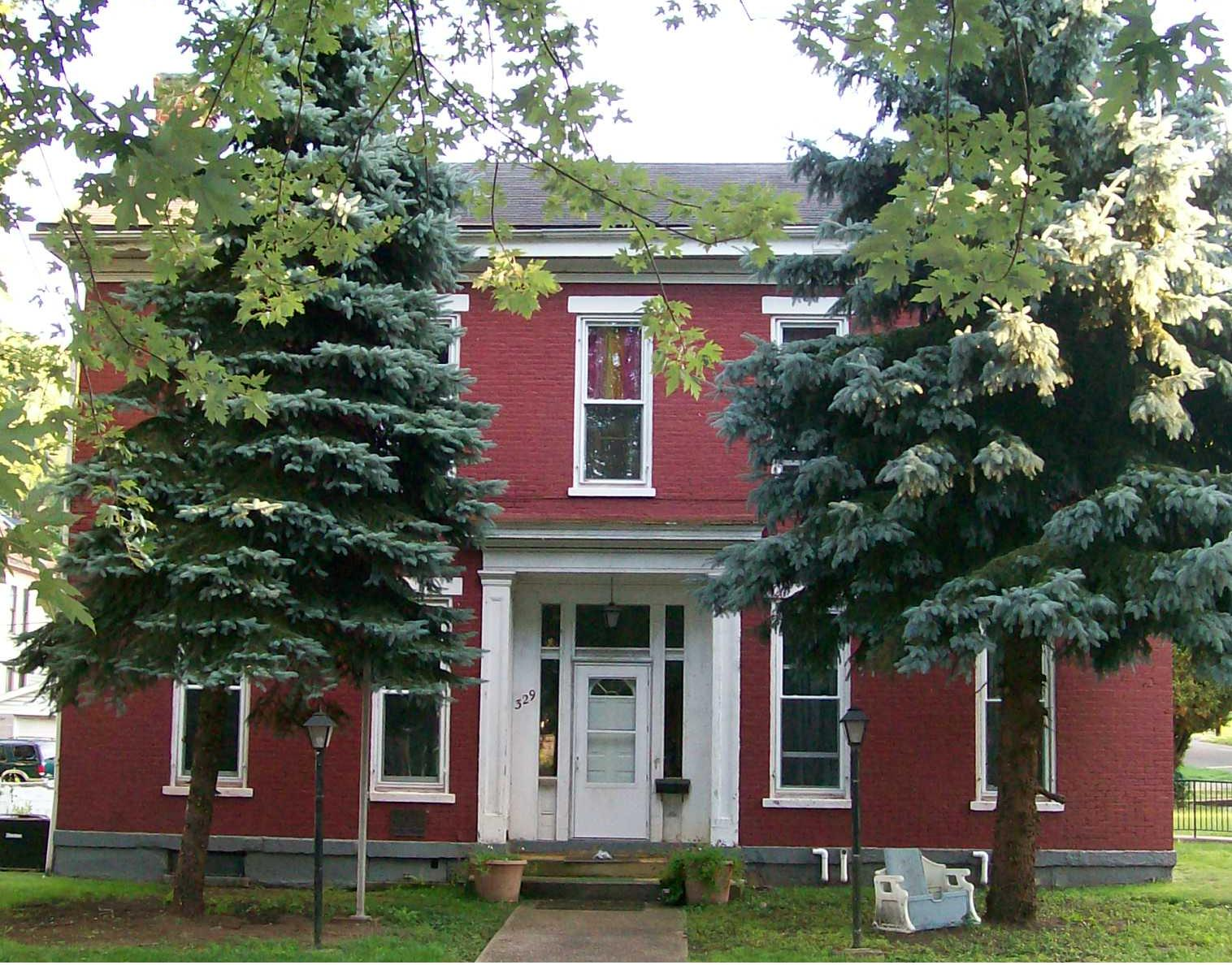
- Front of the house

- Location within Ohio Location within the United States
- Location: 329 Bennett St., Bridgeport, Ohio
- Coordinates: 40°4′8.5″N 80°44′38″W
- Area: Less than 1 acre (0.40 ha)
- Built: 1846
- Architectural style: Greek Revival
- NRHP reference No.: 86000239
- Added to NRHP: February 13, 1986

The Joseph Kirkwood House is a historic house in the village of Bridgeport, Ohio, United States. Originally home to one of the area's oldest families, it was built in the middle of the nineteenth century in a mix of architectural styles. Named a historic site in the 1980s, it has been converted into a health care facility.

A native of Delaware, Robert Kirkwood emigrated to present-day Belmont County in 1789 after fighting in the American Revolution; he and his family were among the region's first settlers. Joseph his son erected the present house in 1846 and arranged for its expansion seven years later by the construction of a large ell to the rear. Set on a foundation of sandstone, the wood-and-brick house is covered with a metal roof. The house combines academic and popular architectural styles: the basic plan is that of an I-house, a vernacular construction mode, although Greek Revival styling is present, especially in the careful symmetry of the five-bay facade. Nine windows fill all bays in both stories, except for the post and lintel-surrounded main entrance in the center of the first story. The fenestration on the side of the original house and on the addition is more irregular: on the second story, a single window sits under the gable, separated by large amounts of brick from a trio of windows at the rear of the ell. Chimneys are placed at both ends of the roofline on the original house, with another such structure in the ell; the roof itself is metal.

In early 1986, the Kirkwood House was listed on the National Register of Historic Places; its connection to Joseph Kirkwood qualified it for designation, as did its historically significant architecture. It is one of two National Register-listed locations in Bridgeport: although located largely in Wheeling, West Virginia across the Ohio River, the Wheeling Island Historic District includes the Aetnaville Bridge, which extends into Bridgeport. By the time of listing, the Kirkwood House was no longer used as a typical residence, having been converted into a group home for the intellectually disabled, "Thresholds to Tomorrow".
