= West Cross (disambiguation) =

West Cross is an area in Swansea, Wales.

West Cross also may refer to:

- West Cross (electoral ward), which includes the West Cross area
- West Cross Street in Morristown Historic District, Morristown, Ohio

== See also ==
- West Cross Route, stretch of elevated highway in Central London
- "W. Cross Pkwy", signage term for Wilbur Cross Parkway in Connecticut, U.S.A.
