= Zweig Building =

- U.S. National Register of Historic Places
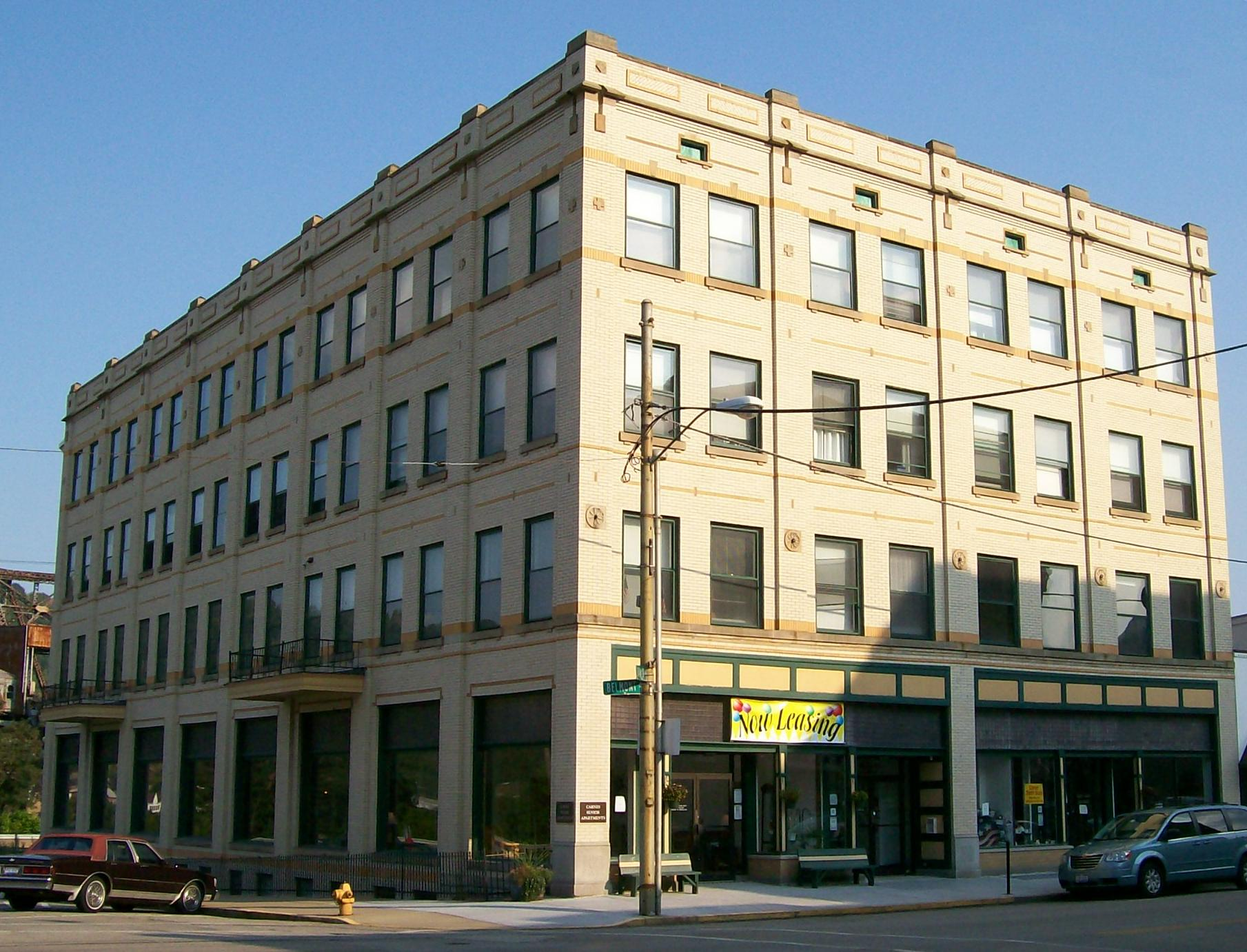
- Front and side

- Location within Ohio Location within the United States
- Location: 3396 Belmont St., Bellaire, Ohio
- Coordinates: 40°0′57″N 80°44′32″W
- Area: Less than 1 acre (0.40 ha)
- Built: 1912
- Architectural style: Early Commercial
- NRHP reference No.: 00000018
- Added to NRHP: January 28, 2000

The Zweig Building is a historic commercial building in downtown Bellaire, Ohio, United States. Constructed in 1912, it is an early example of the Chicago school.

== Structure ==
Constructed of brick, the building sits on a stone foundation and is covered with an asphalt roof. Four stories tall, the facade is four bays wide and the side eight bays wide, with two windows in each bay on each floor. Prominent pilasters separating the bays, in which are placed glass display windows on the first floor, both front and side. To the rear, part of the basement is exposed, due to sloping ground. The Windsor Hotel, established to serve travellers on the Pennsylvania Railroad, was formerly located behind the Zweig.

== History ==
During the early twentieth century, the building was used by small businesses, such as dentists and jewellers.

By the early twenty-first century, much of Bellaire's downtown built environment had been lost to destruction or extensive modifications. The Zweig Building presents a radically different appearance: few changes have been made, and the building retains original features such as prism-like transom lights on the exterior and metal ceilings and hardwood flooring on the interior.

== Recognition ==
Due to its well-preserved historic architecture, the Zweig was listed on the National Register of Historic Places in 2000. It is currently one of five Bellaire locations on the Register, along with the Imperial Glass Company, a house known as Belleview Heights, part of the B & O Railroad Viaduct over the Ohio River, and the towboat Donald B.

In 2001, more than $2.2 million in historic preservation tax credits was given to the building's owner, Bellaire Housing Partners, which used the money in an adaptive reuse project to convert the Zweig Building into elder housing apartments. Their project won recognition from the Ohio Historical Society, which praised the group for retaining the building's architecture during a worthy renovation project.
