= Johnny Pramesa =

American baseball player (1925–1996)

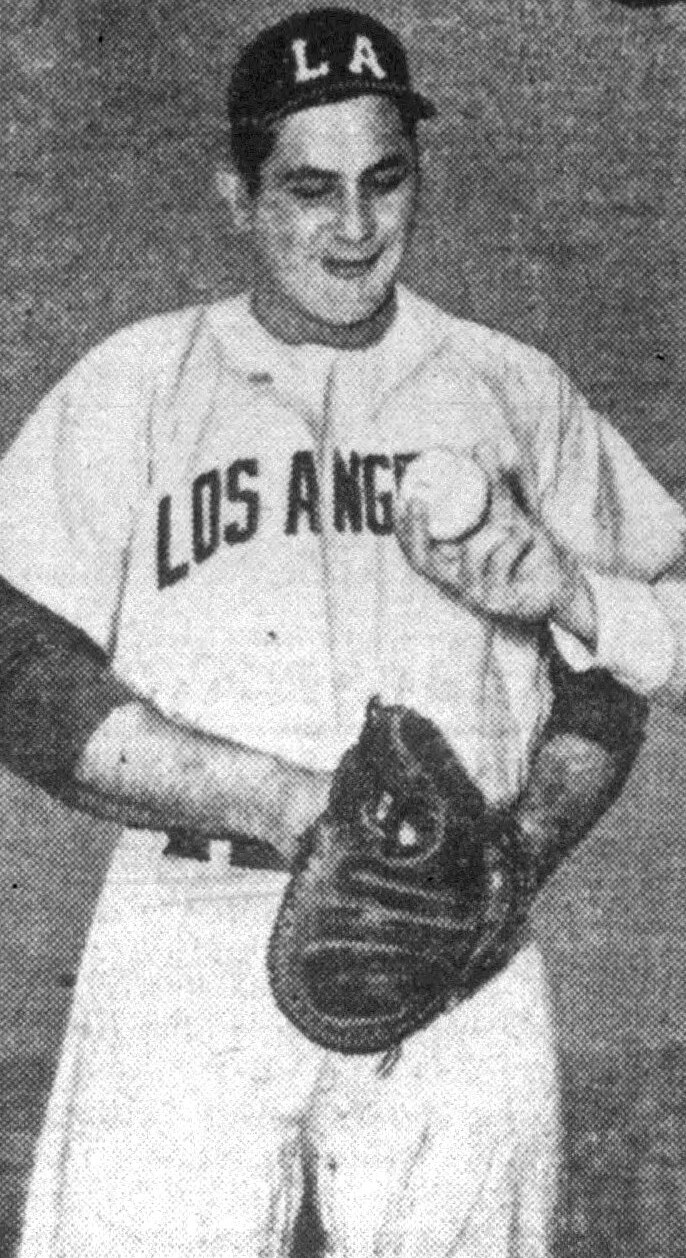
- Pramesa, c. 1954
- Catcher
- Born: August 28, 1925; Barton, Ohio, U.S.
- Died: September 9, 1996 (aged 71); Los Angeles, California, U.S.
- Batted: Right Threw: Right

MLB debut
- April 24, 1949, for the Cincinnati Reds

Last MLB appearance
- July 26, 1952, for the Chicago Cubs

MLB statistics
- Batting average: .268
- Home runs: 13
- Runs batted in: 59
- Stats at Baseball Reference

Teams
- Cincinnati Reds (1949–1951); Chicago Cubs (1952)

John Steven Pramesa (August 28, 1925 – September 9, 1996) was an American professional baseball player, a catcher in the Major Leagues from 1949–1952 for the Chicago Cubs and Cincinnati Reds. A native of Barton, Ohio, he threw and batted right-handed, stood 6 feet 2 inches (1.88 m) tall and weighed 210 pounds (95 kg).

Pramesa spent the full seasons of 1950 and 1951 as the Reds' second-string catcher, playing behind Homer "Dixie" Howell. In 1950, his best MLB season, Pramesa batted .307 in 74 games played and 228 at bats, with a career-high 30 runs batted in.
