= John McLure (steamer captain) =

Captain John McLure (January 22, 1816 – November 5, 1893) was an American steamship captain, boatbuilder, and businessman.

McLure was born in Zelienople, Pennsylvania. His father Andrew, a carpenter, moved the family to Wheeling in what was then the state of Virginia in 1816. In 1832 an eventful trip on a river steamer convinced the young McLure that he wanted to be a steamship engineer. After some time spent working on building ships and engines in Wheeling and in Pittsburgh, he obtained a position as engineer on a steamboat and worked as a first or second engineer until about 1843, when he advanced to captain on the Amazon, a Wheeling-built boat that he had an ownership interest in. He also obtained a pilot's license and worked as both captain and pilot. Over the next few years, McClure and partners built a series of steamboats, which he captained for a time and then sold. McClure worked as a builder, captain, and owner until 1858, when he retired from building boats and captained his own steamboat, the Eunice, until the outbreak of the Civil War.

McLure was nominated as an at-large presidential elector for Abraham Lincoln on the Virginia Republican ticket in 1860. He also attended the First Wheeling Convention in May 1861.

In 1861 the Eunice and McLure entered the service of the Union, ferrying troops up the Kanawha River. In September 1861 he was made commodore of the Kanawha River steamers. In 1862 he commanded a group of three light steamboats, which moved to Tennessee and were converted into gunboats for convoy duty on the Cumberland River. In 1863 he performed the same duty on the Tennessee River in support of Union activity there. McClure then resigned and returned to running steamboats on the Ohio until several years after the war's end.

McLure's uncle, also named John McLure, had come to Wheeling in 1806; he was a prominent merchant, bank president, and the builder of the McLure House hotel, at one point one of the finest hotels in West Virginia. In 1873 Captain McLure took over the ownership of the McLure House from his uncle, who died in 1874 at the age of 91.

In 1875 McLure served as the chairman of a civic committee arranging the removal of the state capital to Wheeling; he captained the steamship Emma Graham, which picked up the governor and state officials and took them to Wheeling in the midst of a controversy over the move.

== Family life ==
McLure married Elizabeth Campbell in 1841; they had eight children: Thomas, Harry, McBurnie, John Jr., Pintie, Juliet, and Betty. Elizabeth died in 1881, and McLure next married Eliza Jane Cecil (born 1833).

McLure died in Wheeling, aged 77.
