= John McLure House =

Historic house in West Virginia, United States

- U.S. National Register of Historic Places
- U.S. Historic district – Contributing property
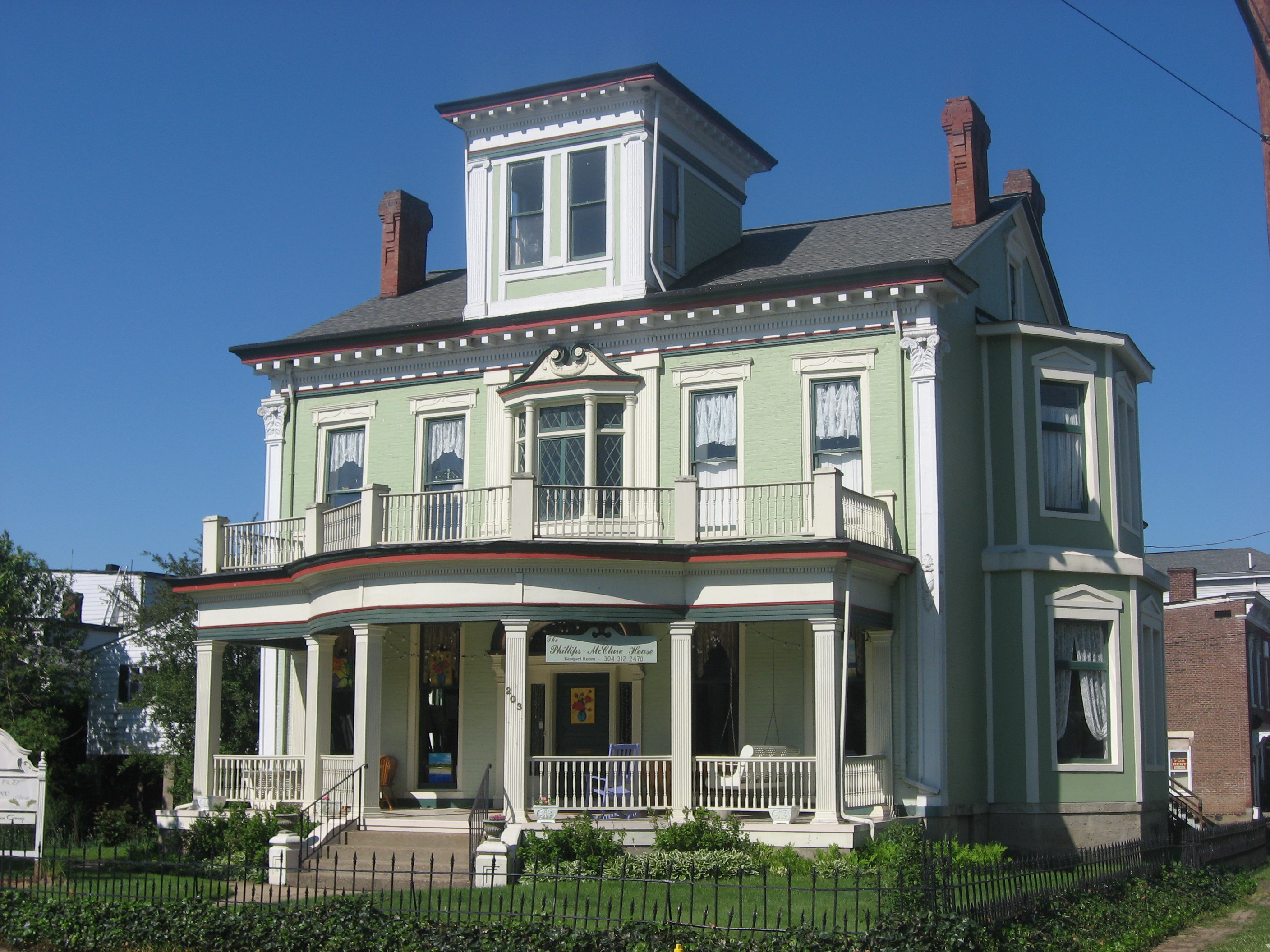
- John McLure House, May 2013

- Location within West Virginia Location within the United States
- Location: 203 S. Front St., Wheeling, West Virginia
- Coordinates: 40°4′8″N 80°43′45″W
- Area: less than one acre
- Architectural style: Classical Revival, Federal
- NRHP reference No.: 91001013
- Added to NRHP: August 5, 1991

John McLure House, also known as the Hans Phillips House, Lawrence Sands House, and Daniel Zane House, is a historic home located on Wheeling Island at Wheeling, Ohio County, West Virginia. It was built between 1853 and 1856 [when the island was a part of Virginia], and is a three-story, Federal-style brick dwelling. A two-story rear addition was built before 1870. A semi-circular columned portico and two-story, projecting side bay, were added in the late 19th century and added Classical Revival elements to the home.

A "widow's walk" was placed on the roof sometime after McLure's death. It was the home of Captain John McLure (1816-1893), an American steamboat master, boatbuilder, and capitalist.

It was listed on the National Register of Historic Places in 1991. It is located in the Wheeling Island Historic District.
