= Harry C. and Jessie F. Franzheim House =

Historic house in West Virginia, United States

- U.S. National Register of Historic Places
- U.S. Historic district – Contributing property
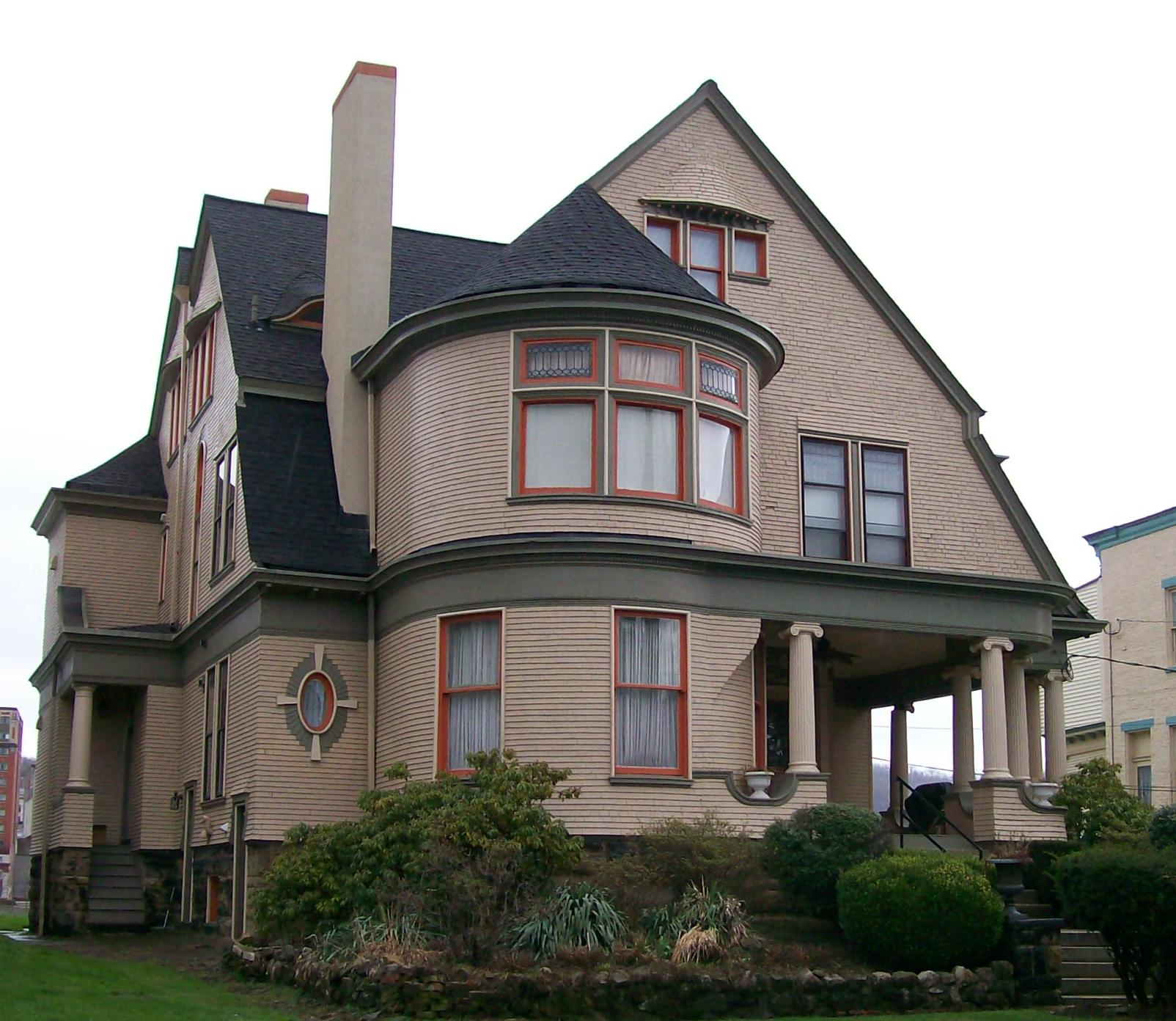
- Harry C. and Jessie F. Franzheim House, March 2010

- Location within West Virginia Location within the United States
- Location: 404 S. Front St., Wheeling, West Virginia
- Coordinates: 40°4′1″N 80°43′45″W
- Area: 0.3 acres (0.12 ha)
- Built: 1897
- Architect: Edward Bates Franzheim
- Architectural style: Bungalow/craftsman, Shingle Style
- NRHP reference No.: 89000183
- Added to NRHP: March 27, 1989

Harry C. and Jessie F. Franzheim House is a historic home located on Wheeling Island at Wheeling, in Ohio County, West Virginia. It was built in 1897, and is a three-story shingle style dwelling. It sits on a sandstone foundation. It features a cross gambrel roof with a long slope, two round towers with curved-glass windows, and a wide front porch with Ionic order columns.

It was listed on the National Register of Historic Places in 1989. It is located in the Wheeling Island Historic District.
