= Barton, Ohio =

Unincorporated community in Ohio, U.S.

Coordinates: 40°06′26″N 80°50′28″W

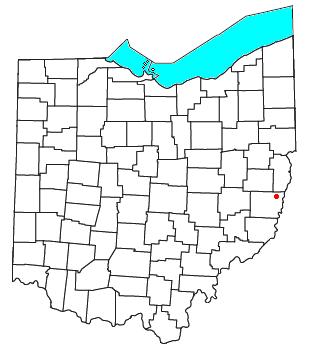
Location of Barton, Ohio

Barton is an unincorporated community in southern Colerain Township, Belmont County, Ohio, United States, along Wheeling Creek. It has a post office with the ZIP code 43905.

Barton is part of the Wheeling, WV–OH Metropolitan Statistical Area.

== History ==
A post office called Barton has been in operation since 1880. Barton was platted in 1905, and named after Abner Barton, the original owner of the land. Barton was originally a mining community.

== Notable people ==
- Ellis R. Dungan, American director who directed many Tamil films in the 1930s to 50s.
- Fraňo Kráľ (1903–1955), Slovak writer and communist politician born in Barton
- Johnny Pramesa, baseball player
