= Colerain Township, Belmont County, Ohio =

Township in Ohio, US

- Township
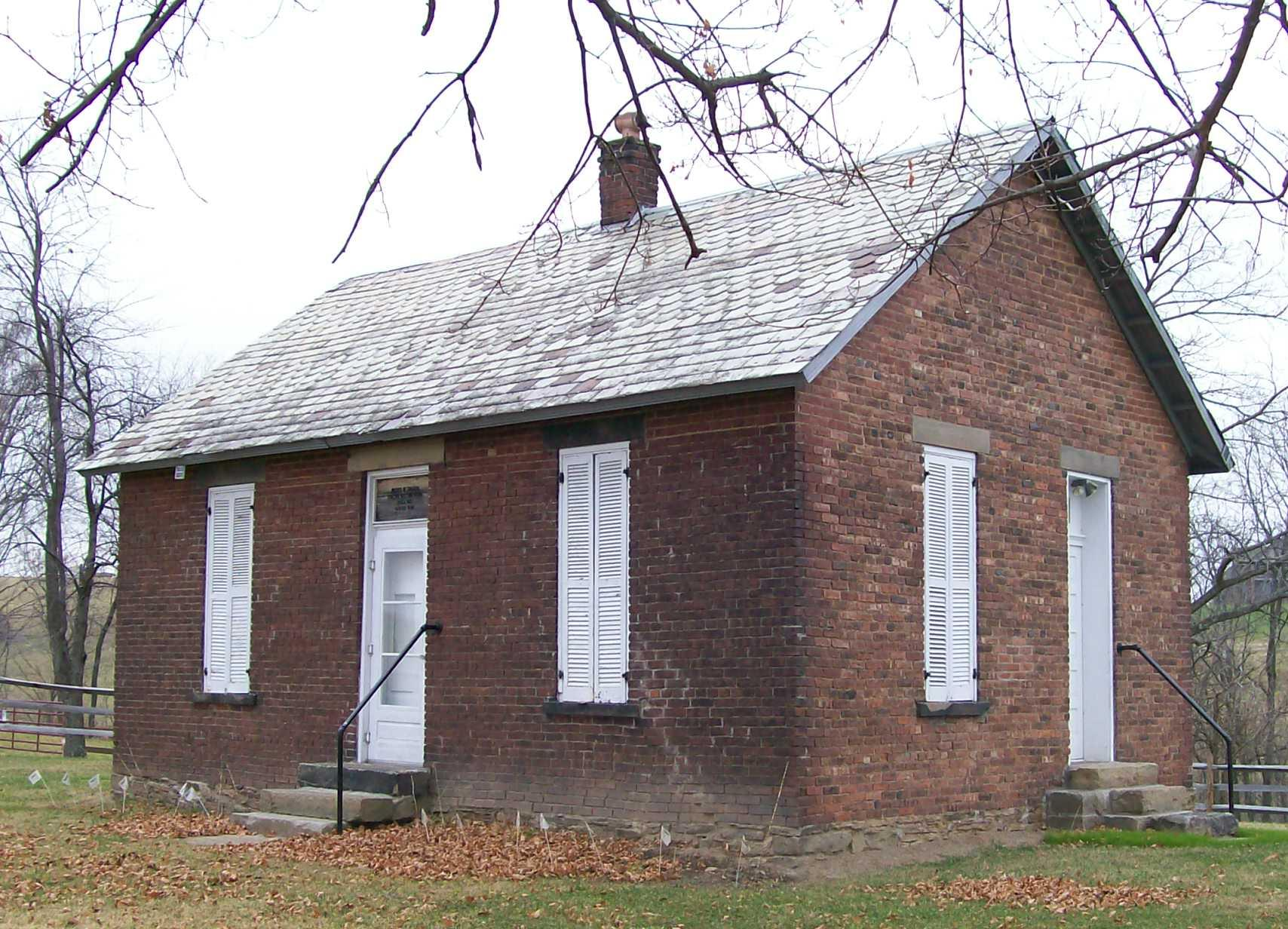
- The Concord Hicksite Friends Meeting House, built 1815

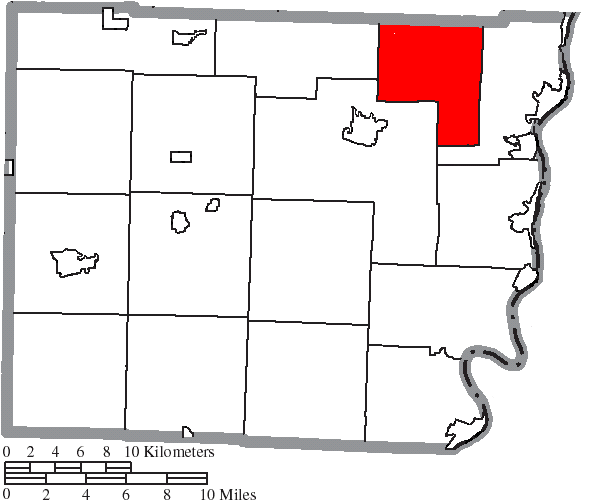
- Location of Colerain Township in Belmont County
- Coordinates: 40°6′54″N 80°49′58″W
- Country: United States
- State: Ohio
- County: Belmont

Area
  - Total: 25.0 sq mi (64.7 km^{2})
  - Land: 24.8 sq mi (64.3 km^{2})
  - Water: 0.15 sq mi (0.4 km^{2})
- Elevation: 1,109 ft (338 m)

Population (2020)
  - Total: 4,174
  - Density: 168/sq mi (64.9/km^{2})
- Time zone: UTC-5 (Eastern (EST))
  - Summer (DST): UTC-4 (EDT)
- ZIP code: 43916
- Area code: 740
- FIPS code: 39-16602
- GNIS feature ID: 1085776

Colerain Township is one of the sixteen townships of Belmont County, Ohio, United States. As of the 2020 census the population was 4,174.

== Geography ==
Located in the northeastern part of the county, it borders the following townships:

- Mount Pleasant Township, Jefferson County - north
- Pease Township - east
- Richland Township - southwest
- Wheeling Township - west
- Short Creek Township, Harrison County - northwest corner

No municipalities are located in Colerain Township, although three unincorporated communities are located in the township:

- Barton in the south
- Colerain in the east
- Maynard in the west

Portions of the unincorporated communities of Blaine and Lansing (a census-designated place) extend into Colerain Township.

== Name and history ==
Colerain Township was organized in 1808. It was named from Coleraine, in Northern Ireland.

Statewide, other Colerain Townships are located in Hamilton and Ross counties.

== Government ==
The township is governed by a three-member board of trustees, who are elected in November of odd-numbered years to a four-year term beginning on the following January 1. Two are elected in the year after the presidential election and one is elected in the year before it. There is also an elected township fiscal officer, who serves a four-year term beginning on April 1 of the year after the election, which is held in November of the year before the presidential election. Vacancies in the fiscal officership or on the board of trustees are filled by the remaining trustees.
