= Morristown, Ohio =

- Village
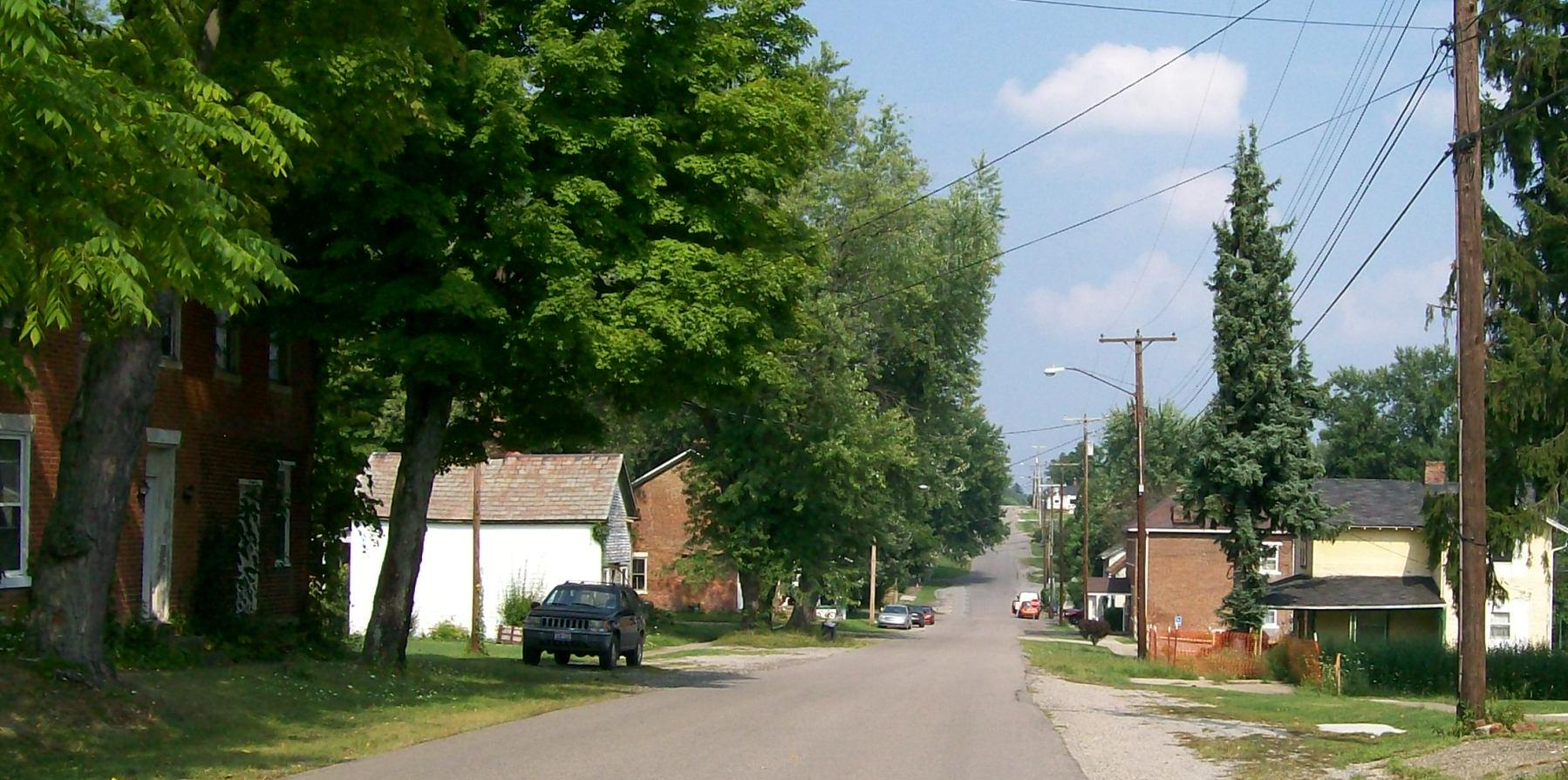
- Morristown Historic District, along the National Road

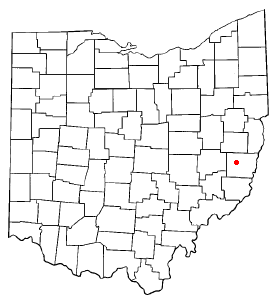
- Location of Morristown, Ohio

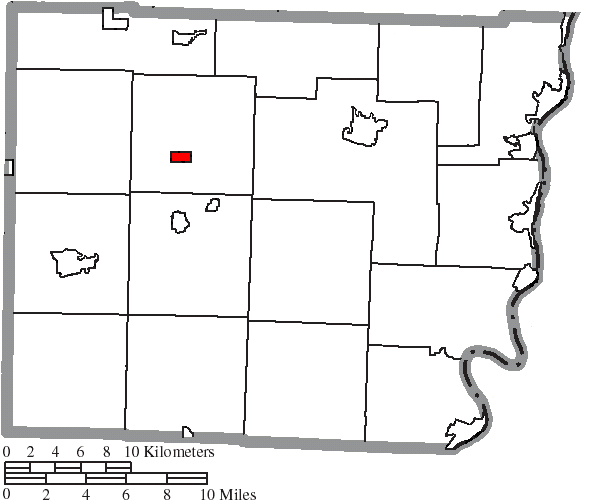
- Location of Morristown in Belmont County
- Coordinates: 40°03′50″N 81°04′11″W
- Country: United States
- State: Ohio
- County: Belmont
- Township: Union
- Founded: 1802

Government
  - Mayor: Heather Stitt

Area
  - Total: 0.63 sq mi (1.63 km^{2})
  - Land: 0.63 sq mi (1.63 km^{2})
  - Water: 0.0039 sq mi (0.01 km^{2})
- Elevation: 1,247 ft (380 m)

Population (2020)
  - Total: 248
  - Density: 394.5/sq mi (152.32/km^{2})
- Time zone: UTC-5 (Eastern (EST))
  - Summer (DST): UTC-4 (EDT)
- ZIP code: 43759
- Area code: 740
- FIPS code: 39-52346
- GNIS feature ID: 2399399
- Website: www.morristownohio.org

Morristown is a village in Union Township, Belmont County, Ohio, United States. The population was 248 at the 2020 census. It is part of the Wheeling metropolitan area.

== History ==
Morristown was platted in 1802. The village was named for Duncan Morrison, a pioneer settler. A variant name was "Morris Town". A post office called Morristown has been in operation since 1807.

Several blocks in downtown Morristown compose the Morristown Historic District, which was added to the National Register of Historic Places in 1980.

== Geography ==
According to the United States Census Bureau, the village has a total area of 0.51 square miles (1.32 km^{2}), all land.

== Demographics ==
Historical population
Census	Pop.	Note	%±
1830	251		—
1850	456		—
1870	423		—
1880	434		2.6%
1890	371		−14.5%
1900	350		−5.7%
1910	280		−20.0%
1920	315		12.5%
1930	366		16.2%
1940	410		12.0%
1950	404		−1.5%
1960	396		−2.0%
1970	385		−2.8%
1980	463		20.3%
1990	296		−36.1%
2000	299		1.0%
2010	303		1.3%
2020	248		−18.2%
U.S. Decennial Census

=== 2010 census ===
As of the census of 2010, there were 303 people, 124 households, and 78 families living in the village. The population density was 594.1 inhabitants per square mile (229.4/km^{2}). There were 143 housing units at an average density of 280.4 per square mile (108.3/km^{2}). The racial makeup of the village was 96.7% White, 1.7% African American, 0.3% Native American, 0.7% from other races, and 0.7% from two or more races. Hispanic or Latino of any race were 1.0% of the population.

There were 124 households, of which 24.2% had children under the age of 18 living with them, 50.8% were married couples living together, 8.9% had a female householder with no husband present, 3.2% had a male householder with no wife present, and 37.1% were non-families. 29.0% of all households were made up of individuals, and 13% had someone living alone who was 65 years of age or older. The average household size was 2.24 and the average family size was 2.73.

The median age in the village was 43.8 years. 24.4% of residents were under the age of 18; 7.7% were between the ages of 18 and 24; 18.8% were from 25 to 44; 30.7% were from 45 to 64; and 18.5% were 65 years of age or older. The gender makeup of the village was 54.1% male and 45.9% female.

=== 2000 census ===
As of the census of 2000, there were 299 people, 122 households, and 81 families living in the village. The population density was 591.8 inhabitants per square mile (228.5/km^{2}). There were 138 housing units at an average density of 273.1 per square mile (105.4/km^{2}). The racial makeup of the village was 99.33% White, 0.33% African American, and 0.33% from two or more races. Hispanic or Latino of any race were 1.34% of the population.

There were 122 households, out of which 30.3% had children under the age of 18 living with them, 54.1% were married couples living together, 8.2% had a female householder with no husband present, and 33.6% were non-families. 27.0% of all households were made up of individuals, and 13.9% had someone living alone who was 65 years of age or older. The average household size was 2.45 and the average family size was 3.05.

In the village, the population was spread out, with 24.7% under the age of 18, 6.7% from 18 to 24, 30.8% from 25 to 44, 24.1% from 45 to 64, and 13.7% who were 65 years of age or older. The median age was 39 years. For every 100 females there were 92.9 males. For every 100 females age 18 and over, there were 89.1 males.

The median income for a household in the village was $34,375, and the median income for a family was $40,750. Males had a median income of $30,357 versus $18,929 for females. The per capita income for the village was $15,212. About 5.0% of families and 7.2% of the population were below the poverty line, including 6.6% of those under the age of eighteen and none of those 65 or over.

== Transportation ==
About half a mile south of Morristown is Interstate 70 and closest Mile Marker is 208. Morristown's Main Street is the original US 40.
