= Colerain, Ohio =

Unincorporated community in Ohio, U.S.

Coordinates: 40°07′33″N 80°48′31″W

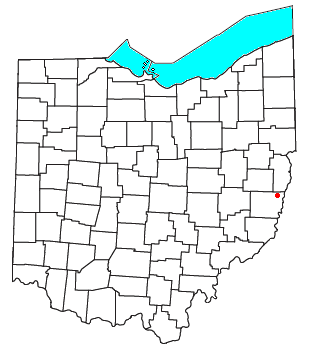
Location of Colerain, Ohio

Colerain /ˈkoʊlreɪn/ is an unincorporated community in eastern Colerain Township, Belmont County, Ohio, United States. It has a post office with the ZIP code 43916. It lies along U.S. Route 250.

Colerain is part of the Wheeling, WV-OH Metropolitan Statistical Area.

== History ==
The community was named after Coleraine, Northern Ireland, the ancestral home of a share of the first settlers. A post office called Colerain was established in 1825, and remained in operation until 1907. Colerain was originally built up chiefly by Quakers from North Carolina and Virginia, who left those states due to their opposition to slavery.

== Notable people ==
- Josiah Fox, Naval architect
- Fred Negus, Football player
