= Dr. Lindley Schooley House and Office =

Historic house in Ohio, United States

- U.S. National Register of Historic Places
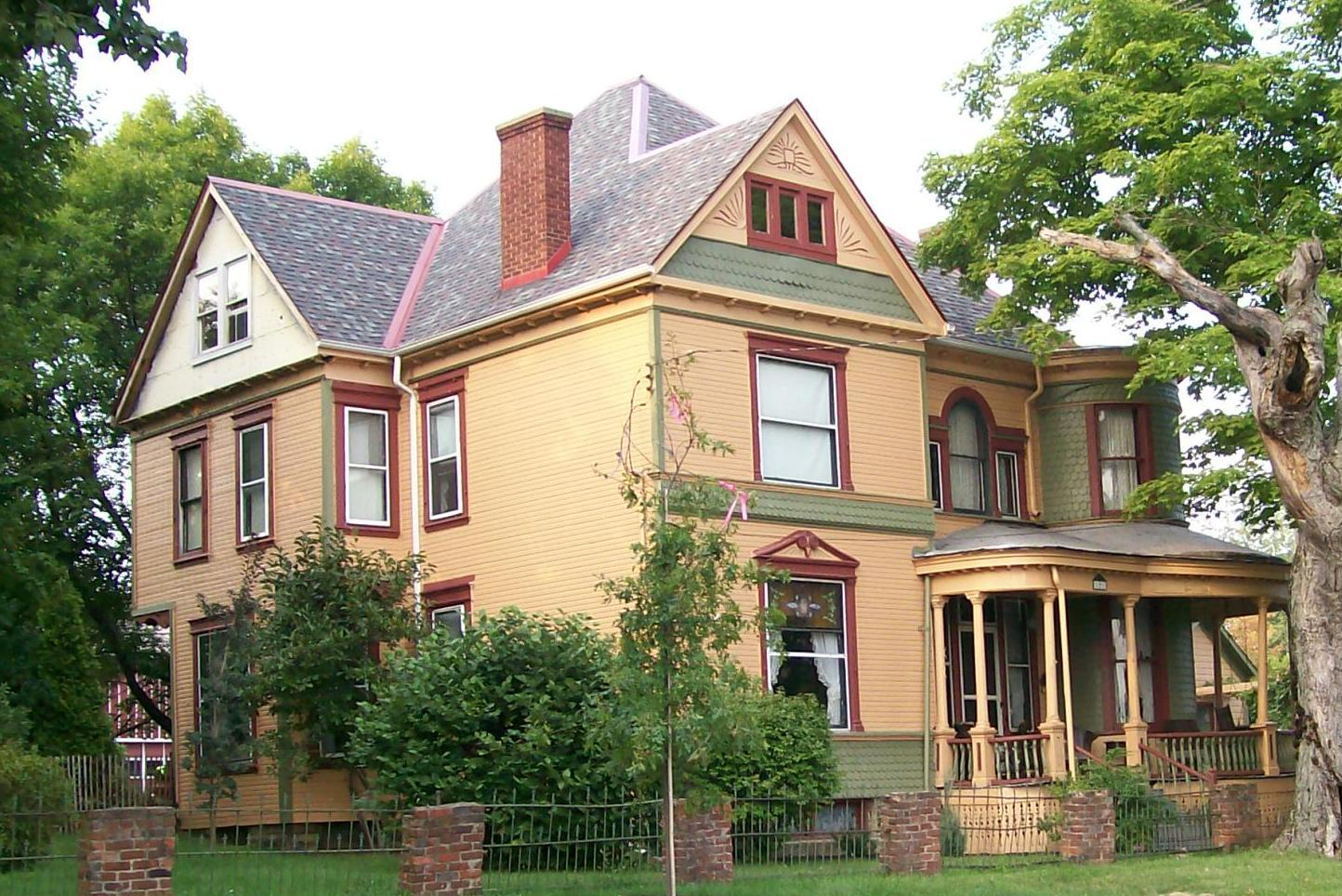
- The Lindley-Schooley House in Belmont, Ohio

- Location within Ohio Location within the United States
- Location: Main St., Belmont, Ohio
- Coordinates: 40°1′45″N 81°2′31″W
- Built: 1895
- Architectural style: Queen Anne
- NRHP reference No.: 82003545
- Added to NRHP: April 1, 1982

The Dr. Lindley Schooley House and Office is a Queen Anne style house in Belmont, Ohio. The house on Main Street was built around 1895 for Dr. Lindley Schooley (1824-1908).

It was added to the National Register in 1982.

== History ==
Dr. Lindley Schooley was born in Belmont in 1824. He attended Starling Medical College in Columbus and graduated in the 1840s. He moved back to Belmont in 1851 and completed his Queen Anne-style home in 1895. He practiced medicine in the community and even held the position as president of the First National Bank of Belmont at age 78, in 1902, until his death in 1908 at the age of 84.
