= Donald B. (towboat) =

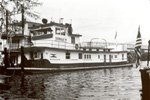

History
- Name: Donald B
- Builder: Marietta Manufacturing
- Launched: 1923

General characteristics
- Tonnage: 51 GRT
- Displacement: 108 long tons (110 t)
- Length: 99 ft (30 m) LOA
- Beam: 18 ft (5.5 m)
- Draft: 32 in (0.8 m)
- Installed power: 160 hp (120 kW) direct reversing diesel engine
- Propulsion: Sternwheel
- Donald B (towboat)
- U.S. National Register of Historic Places
- U.S. National Historic Landmark
- Location within Ohio Location within the United States
- Location: Bellaire, Ohio
- Coordinates: 40°1′16″N 80°44′17″W
- NRHP reference No.: 89002458

Significant dates
- Added to NRHP: December 20, 1989
- Designated NHL: December 20, 1989

Standard, also known historically as Donald B and Barbara H, is a paddlewheel towboat that has been named a US National Historic Landmark and is now based at Bellaire in eastern Ohio. Built in 1923, she is the oldest surviving unaltered rear-wheel towboat afloat. The boat was declared a National Historic Landmark in 1989.

== Description and history ==
The boat measures 99 feet (30 m) long overall, with a hull length of 80 feet (24 m), and an 18-foot (5.5 m) beam. She draws 32 inches (0.8 m). She is powered by a 160-horsepower (120 kW) 1940 Fairbanks-Morse 35E10 direct reversing diesel engine. She measures 51 gross registry tons and displaces approximately 108 long tons (110 t). She is fashioned out of steel plates riveted to a steel frame. She has a scow-form bow fitted with special "knees" used in pushing barges, and a flat bottom with no keel.

She was laid down in 1923 at Marietta Manufacturing in Point Pleasant, West Virginia, and entered the service of the Standard Oil Company of Ohio as Standard, who used her to move gasoline to distribution points along the river. She was sold in 1940 to Ray Brookbank, who renamed her Donald B after his son, who eventually became her captain. Under the Brookbanks' ownership she engaged in general service, moving all manner of barges up and down the Mississippi River watershed. Her hull was completely replated in 1958. Her service as a towboat ended in 2000, and she was sold the following year to Steve Huffman, who named her Barbara H after his wife, and berthed her near Vevey, Indiana. Huffman sold her to Capt Robert Harrison in 2012, who relocated her to Bellaire, Ohio.

Boats of a comparable age have either been scrapped, altered from their original configuration for private use, or are in museum collections. At the time of her landmark designation, she was the only rear-wheel diesel towboat in active service.

== Nomenclature ==
- Standard (1923–1940), owned by Standard Oil Company of Ohio
- Donald B (1940–2001), named after the owner's son, Donald Brookbank, who later became her captain
- Barbara H (2001–2012), named after the captain's wife, Barbara Huffman
- Standard (2012–)

Vessels that move barges on the Mississippi River and its tributaries are known as "towboats" despite the fact that they do not tow barges, but always push them from behind.

== See also ==
- List of National Historic Landmarks in Ohio
- National Register of Historic Places listings in Belmont County, Ohio
