= Opatrny Village Site =

Archaeological site in Ohio, United States

- U.S. National Register of Historic Places
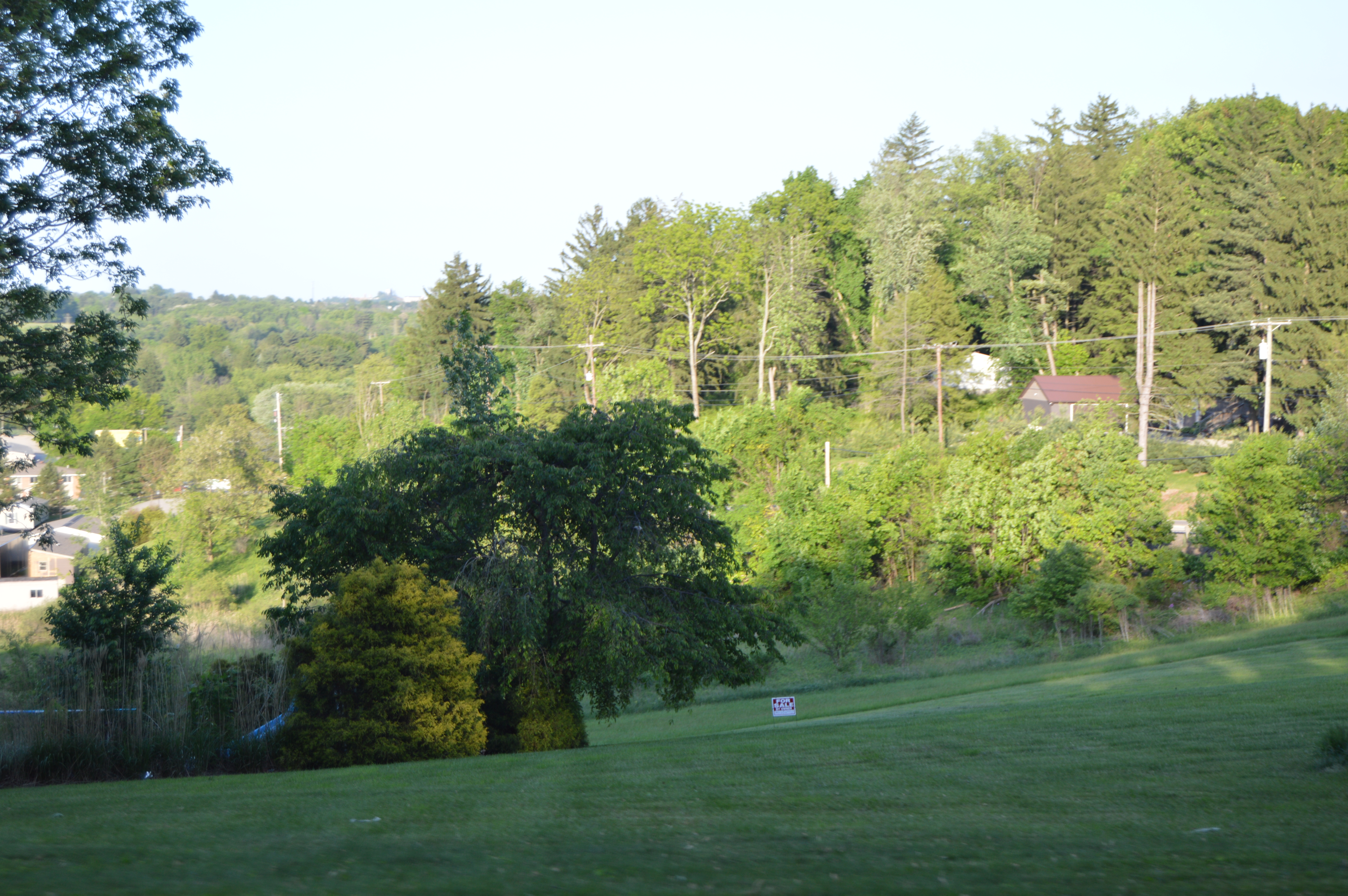
- Overview of the site

- Location within Ohio Location within the United States
- Location: U.S. Route 40 north of the Belmont Hills Country Club
- Nearest city: St. Clairsville, Ohio
- Coordinates: 40°4′29″N 80°56′36″W
- Area: 50 acres (20 ha)
- NRHP reference No.: 75001323
- Added to NRHP: May 21, 1975

The Opatrny Village Site is an ancient village site dating from AD 1000–1600. The site was inhabited by the Monongahela culture and is a contemporary with the Fort Ancient cultural way of life. The property was placed on the National Register on 1975-05-21.

The extent of the site has not been fully determined as the artifacts lie in occupational debris over 1.5 feet thick. The site has been used as a pasture and remains largely intact. The property was placed to protect the integrity of the site from a highway project.

Around 1980, an extensive excavation was carried out at Opatrny; the information that it yielded was seen as highly significant in understanding the ways that local cultures changed and developed their surrounding terrain. Despite its location along U.S. Route 40, the village remains less disturbed by modern development than most surrounding terrain.
