= Great Western Schoolhouse =

- U.S. National Register of Historic Places
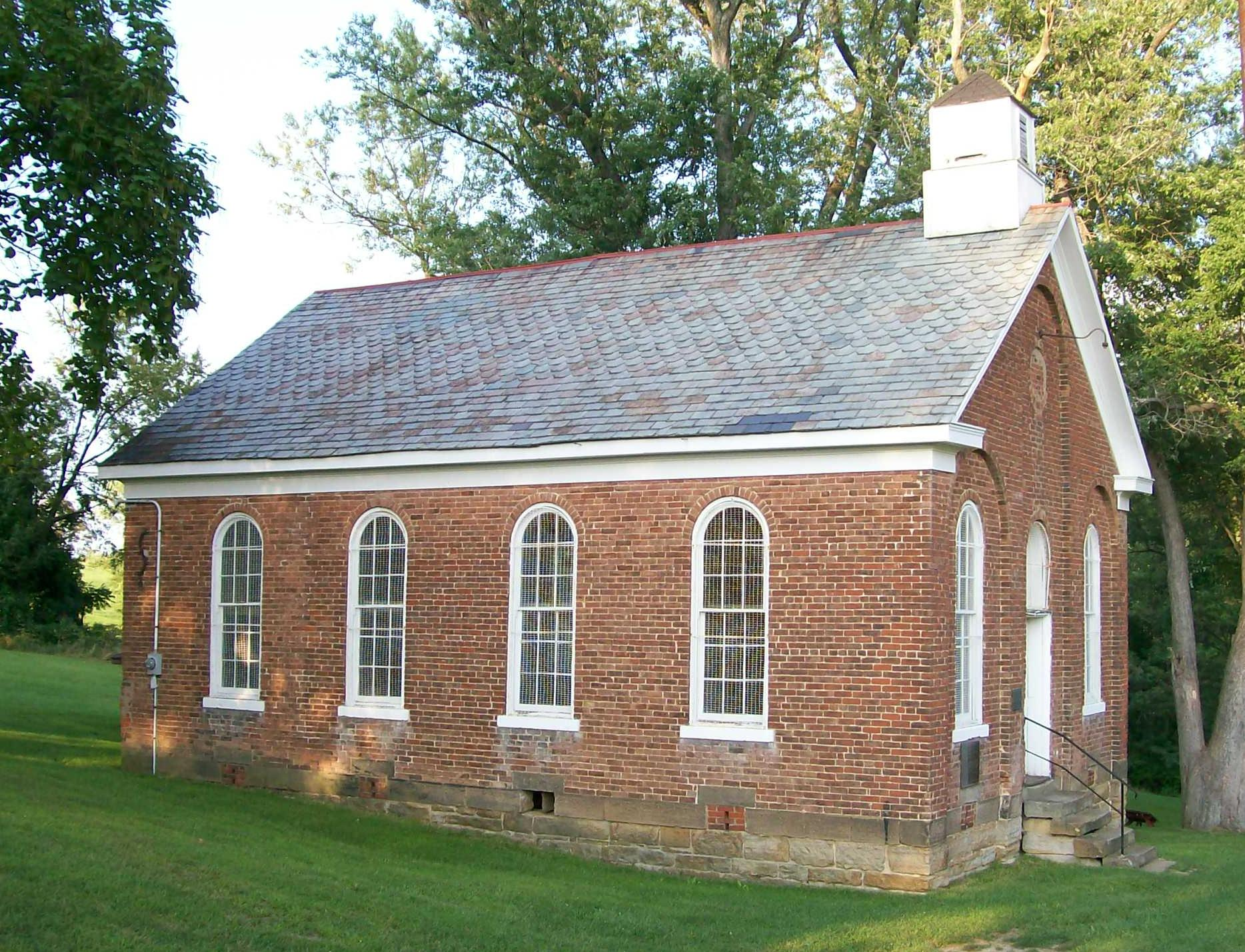
- The Great Western Schoolhouse west of St. Clairsville, Ohio on US Route 40

- Location within Ohio Location within the United States
- Nearest city: St. Clairsville, Ohio
- Coordinates: 40°4′22″N 80°58′52″W
- Built: 1870
- Architectural style: Georgian
- NRHP reference No.: 79001787
- Added to NRHP: May 7, 1979

The Great Western Schoolhouse was built in 1870 along the then-developing National Road, west of St. Clairsville, Ohio. The schoolhouse is a traditional one room schoolhouse and was used until 1952. The building is currently used as a museum highlighting early education in southeastern Ohio and is open by appointment.
