= Wheeling Island Historic District =

Historic district in West Virginia, United States

- U.S. National Register of Historic Places
- U.S. Historic district
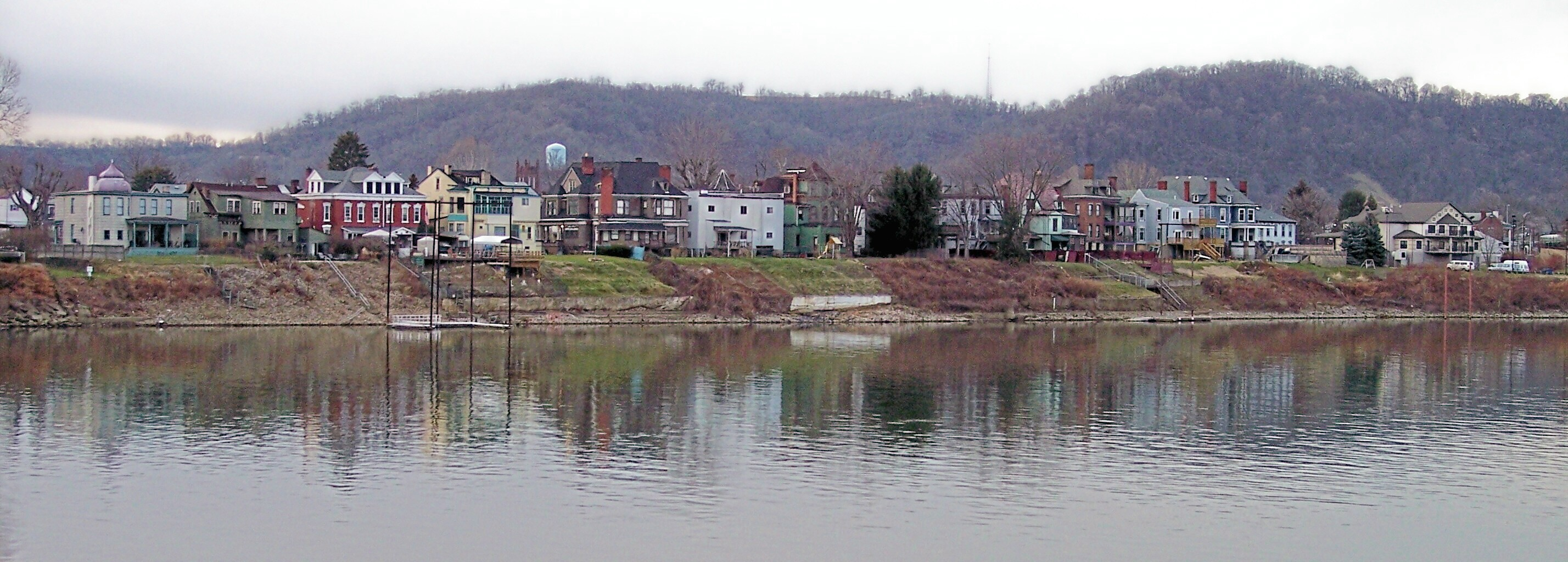
- Wheeling Island, December 2006

- Location within West Virginia Location within the United States
- Location: Roughly bounded by Stone, Front, North, Ontario, Erie and Wabash Sts., Wheeling, West Virginia
- Coordinates: 40°4′17″N 80°43′57″W
- Area: 370 acres (150 ha)
- Architectural style: Bungalow/craftsman, Italianate, Queen Anne
- NRHP reference No.: 92000320
- Added to NRHP: April 2, 1992

Wheeling Island Historic District is a national historic district located on Wheeling Island in Wheeling, Ohio County, West Virginia. The district includes 1,110 contributing buildings, 5 contributing sites, 2 contributing structures, and 3 contributing objects. It is a largely residential district consisting of two-story, frame detached dwellings built in the mid- to late-19th and early-20th century, including the Irwin-Brues House (1853) and a number of houses on Zane Street. The houses are representative of a number of popular architectural styles including Bungalow, Italianate, Queen Anne, and Colonial Revival. Notable non-residential contributing properties include the Exposition Building (1924), Thompson United Methodist Church (1913–1915), Madison School (1916), firehouse (1930–1931), the Bridgeport Bridge (1893), the Aetnaville Bridge (1891), "The Marina," Wheeling Island Baseball Park, and "Belle Island Park." It includes the separately listed Wheeling Suspension Bridge, Harry C. and Jessie F. Franzheim House, and John McLure House.

It was listed on the National Register of Historic Places in 1992.
