= Morristown Historic District =

Historic district in Ohio, United States

- U.S. National Register of Historic Places
- U.S. Historic district
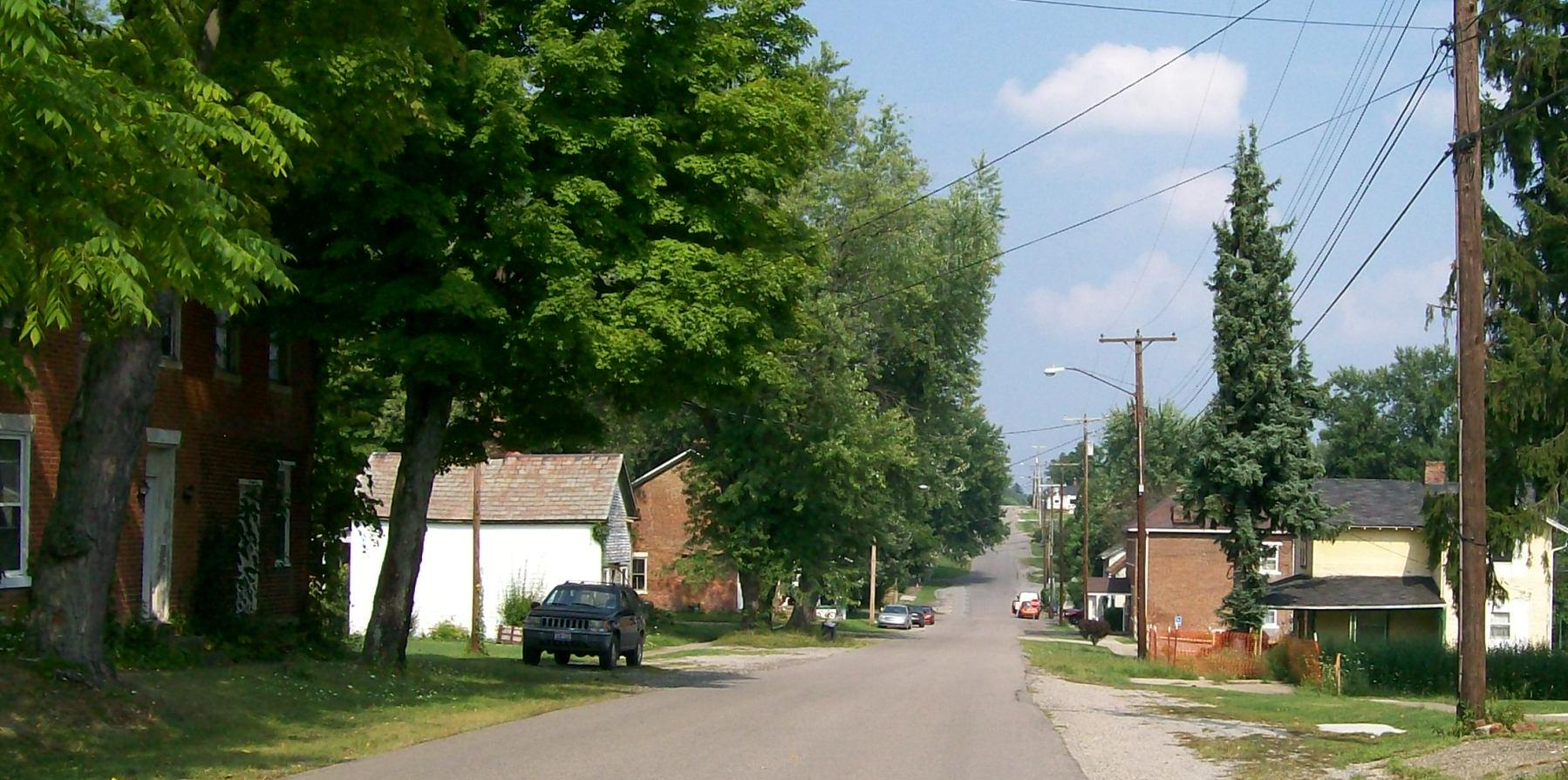
- Main Street in the district

- Location within Ohio Location within the United States
- Location: Church, Main, W. Cross, E. Cross, and Middle Cross Sts., Morristown, Ohio
- Coordinates: 40°3′49″N 81°4′23″W
- Area: 42 acres (17 ha)
- Architectural style: Greek Revival, Gothic Revival
- NRHP reference No.: 80002943
- Added to NRHP: March 6, 1980

The Morristown Historic District is a nationally recognized historic district embracing much of the village of Morristown, Ohio, United States. Founded along the National Road, Morristown prospered as long as the road was heavily travelled, but it stagnated after railroads became prominent. Because the community neither died nor prospered, it has retained its mid-nineteenth-century architecture into the present, making it one of the National Road's least-changed settlements.

Settled in the early nineteenth century, Morristown prospered after the National Road became its main street in 1826. In its first decades, the village was heavily dependent on the road; during the 1850s, more than forty National Road-related businesses lined its streets. However, prosperity departed soon afterward: railroads were built through eastern Ohio in the 1850s, supplanting the National Road as the major mode of transportation, and because no railroad served Morristown, it lost most of its commerce. Buildings continued to be erected into the 1870s, but comparatively little construction occurred in later decades. Nevertheless, the village remained, and benign neglect contributed to Morristown's preservation: no other National Road community in eastern Ohio has experienced so few changes since the road's heyday. Part of its significance derives from construction methods. Most buildings are vernacular structures built of brick in Flemish bond, setting Morristown apart from surrounding communities, which possess few historic brick buildings.

In early 1980, the Morristown Historic District was declared, with boundaries encompassing 42 acres (17 ha); seventy of the district's eighty-six buildings were rated as contributing properties, as was the village cemetery. Limited destruction and limited new construction has left Morristown with nearly all of its mid-19th century built environment, enabling the district to qualify for the Register both because of its place in area history and because of its historic architecture.
