= Tower Site =

Archaeological site in Ohio, United States

- U.S. National Register of Historic Places
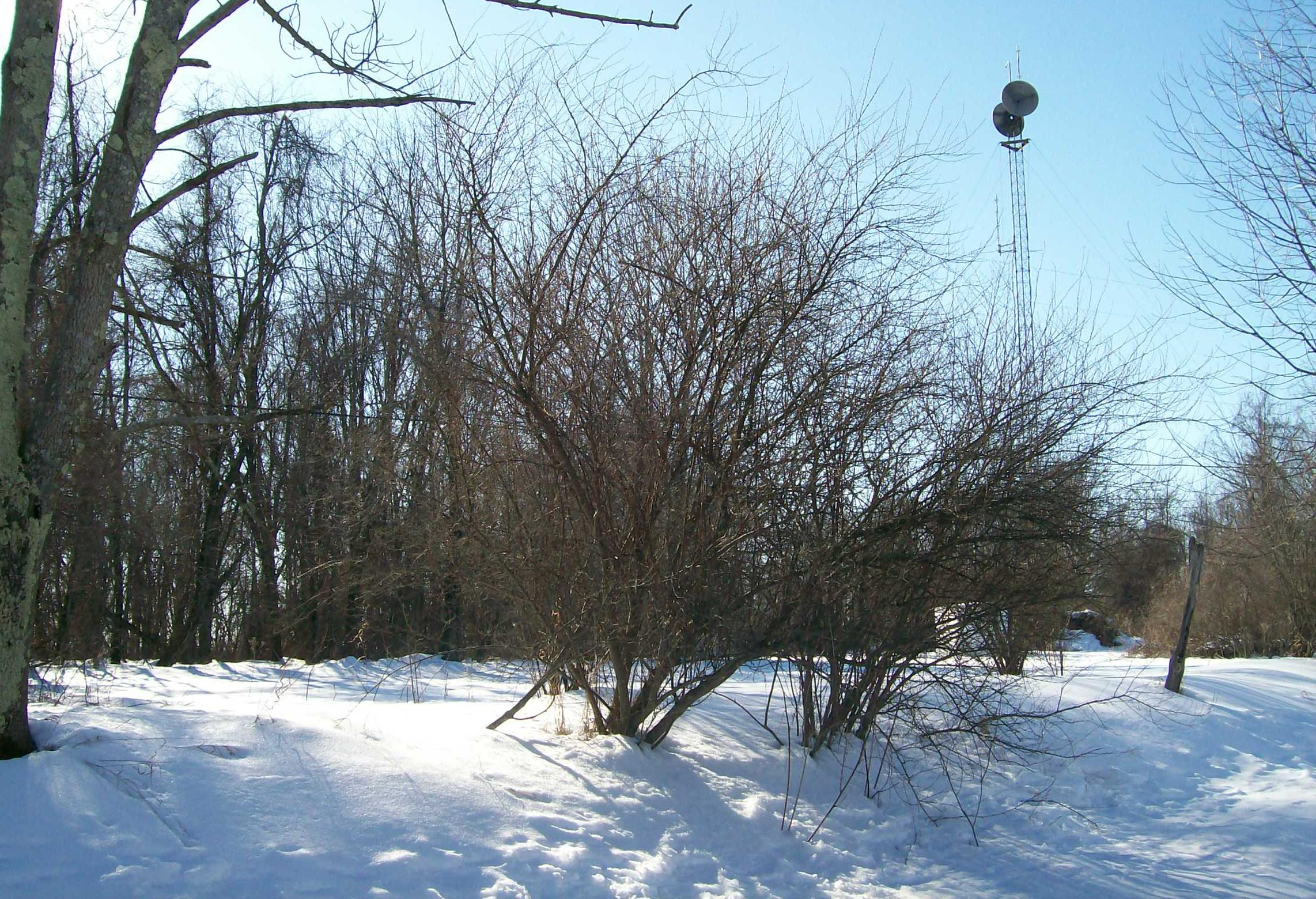
- The site in March 2010

- Location within Ohio Location within the United States
- Location: On a hilltop 4 miles northwest of Barnesville
- Nearest city: Barnesville, Ohio
- Coordinates: 40°1′23″N 81°13′16″W
- Area: 3.5 acres (1.4 ha)
- NRHP reference No.: 82003544
- Added to NRHP: June 11, 1982

The Tower Site (or 33-Bl-15) is a prehistoric village site dating from 1000 to 1499 AD and is closely associated with the Monongahela culture. Located around 4 miles (6.4 km) north-west of Barnesville, Ohio, United States, the site was placed on the National Register of Historic Places in 1982.

== History ==
The site was once a prehistoric village for the Monongahela and is just one of several village sites located throughout Ohio. Located on a high hilltop with an elevation of 1,360 feet (410 m), the site is located between the headwaters of two prominent creeks, it provided an excellent site for habitation.

The village encompassed around 2-3 acres of land with huts, refuse pits and burial features ringing a central plaza devoid of any structure. The site has yielded the human remains of 3 separate natives, two female and one male. Early local residents claimed the site as a burial ground due to a large amount of human remains found when a county road was laid out through the middle of the village site. The eastern side of the site has not been investigated as permission has been repeatedly refused by the landowner.

The site was abandoned sometime around 1500 AD for unknown reasons.

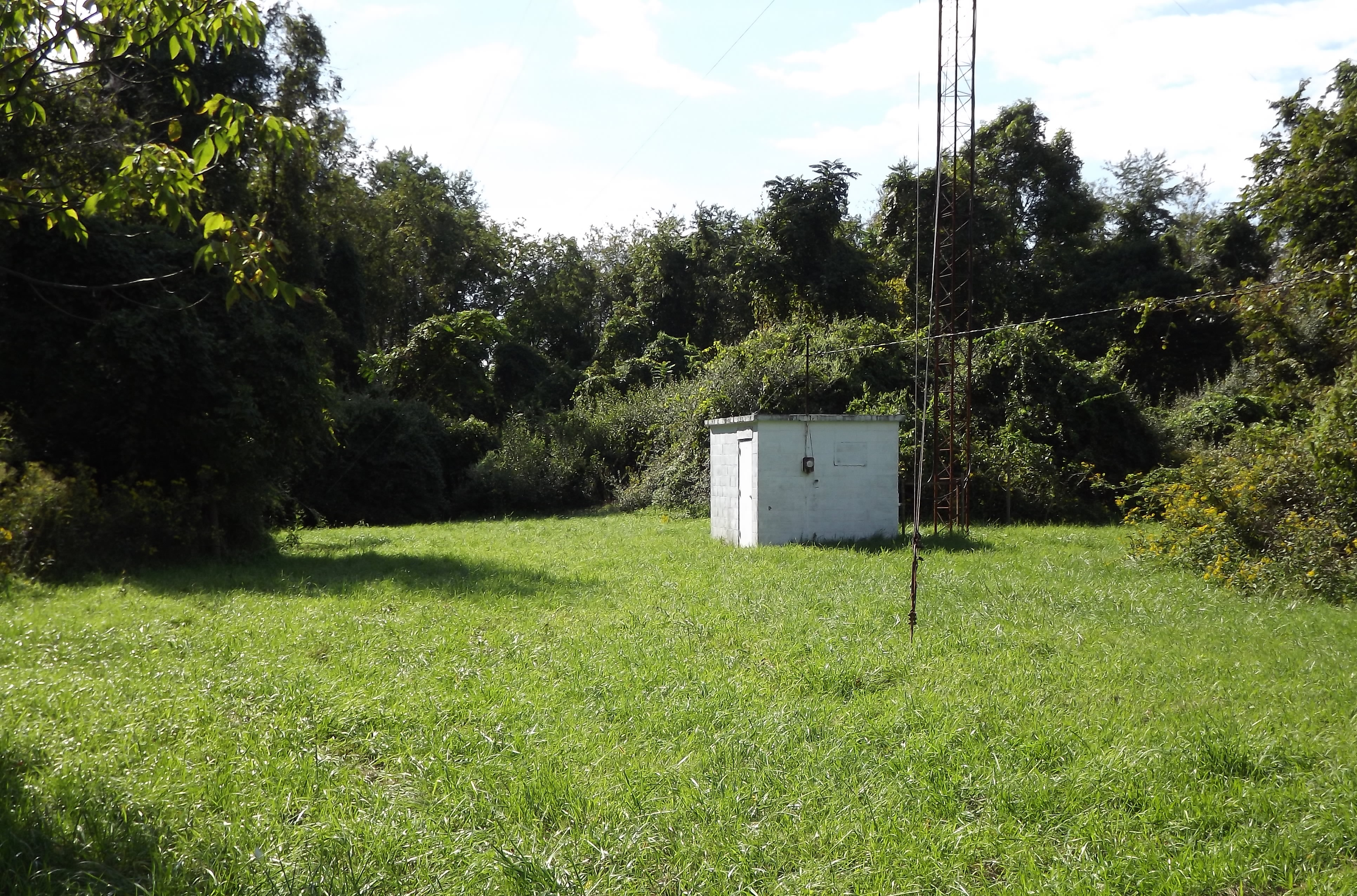
The Tower Site in September 2012.

== Current Condition ==
The location was fenced off to keep trespassers out and also to mark the village bounds from the local mining operations. The location also houses a radio relay tower, which lends its name to the site. The site was severely "potholed" (cylindrical sections are dug up and sifted, compared to a large square excavation), revealing pottery shards, bone fragments, arrow heads and beads. The many finds brought attention to the site as it was discovered to be a village instead of just a burial ground. Several excavations during the late 1970s by Kent State University's archaeological department further discovered hundreds of animal bone fragments, pottery shards, arrow heads, cannel coal pendants, shells, beads, as well as a burial pit containing a female skeleton.

The coal company completed most operations in the area of the Tower Site, leaving the site comparatively quiet. The fence has recently been removed as the site is under ongoing surveillance to protect it from vandals.
