= Brokaw Site =

Archaeological site in Ohio, United States

- U.S. National Register of Historic Places
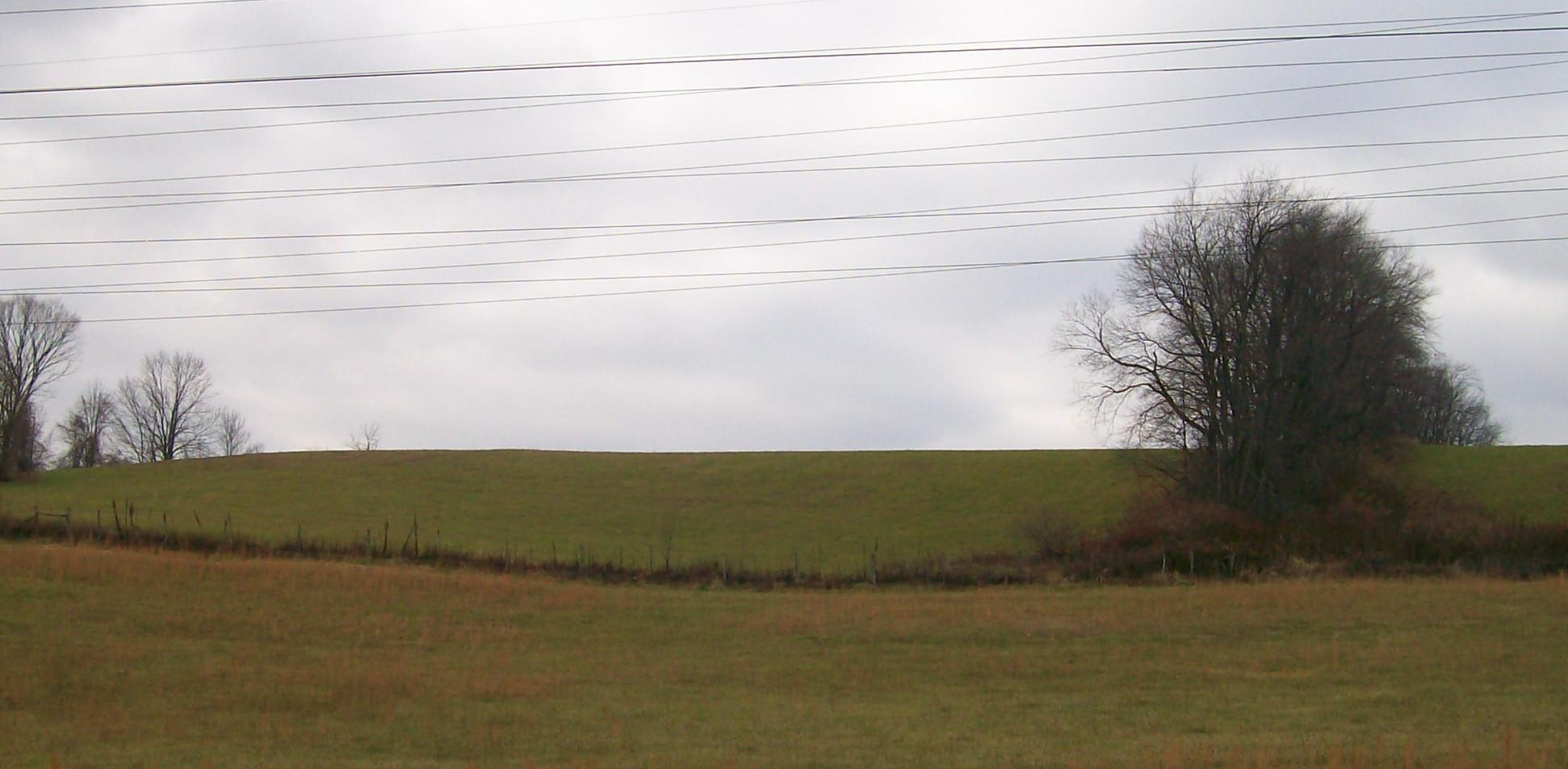
- The Brokaw Site in 2009.
- Nearest city: St. Clairsville, Ohio
- Area: 2.5 acres (1.0 ha)
- NRHP reference No.: 76001371
- Added to NRHP: June 17, 1976

The Brokaw Site is located off of U.S. Route 40 in Richland Township, just west of St. Clairsville, Ohio. The site was added to the National Register on 1976-06-17.

== History ==
The site was once the location of a prehistoric village originally settled in the Archaic period and later by the Middle to Late Woodland people, as the discovery record has turned up projectile points and ceramics dating from those time periods.

The main village site is located on the relatively flat top of a hill roughly about 1,240 feet (380 m) above sea level. The site is estimated to encompass 2-3 acres. The site during its occupation overlooked a roughly-hewn hunting trail, later used as the outline of the first roads and eventually becoming National Road. This vantage point, plus the presence of four springs which flow downstream into a feeder creek of the Ohio River, made this site ideal for settlement.

The property was bought by John Brokaw, who settled into a homestead on a part of the same hilltop. It was during his ownership that several artifacts were found, resulting in Brokaw authorizing a dig site during the years from 1972-1974. After extensive study, the investigating team approached Brokaw about placing the site on the National Register. Brokaw informed the team that the site was directly above a large coal seam and had already given permission for the strip mining of the area. However, the mining activity was delayed indefinitely as the site was eventually placed on the Register by the National Park Service.

== Today ==
The entire hilltop was cleared around the start of the 20th century as evidenced by the bordering Locust and cherry trees in the fence lines and has been used as pasture and cultivation land. Much of the surrounding area has been radically transformed, as an ongoing housing development is slowly encroaching on the site and a reservoir was dug out east of the site.
