= Aetnaville Bridge =

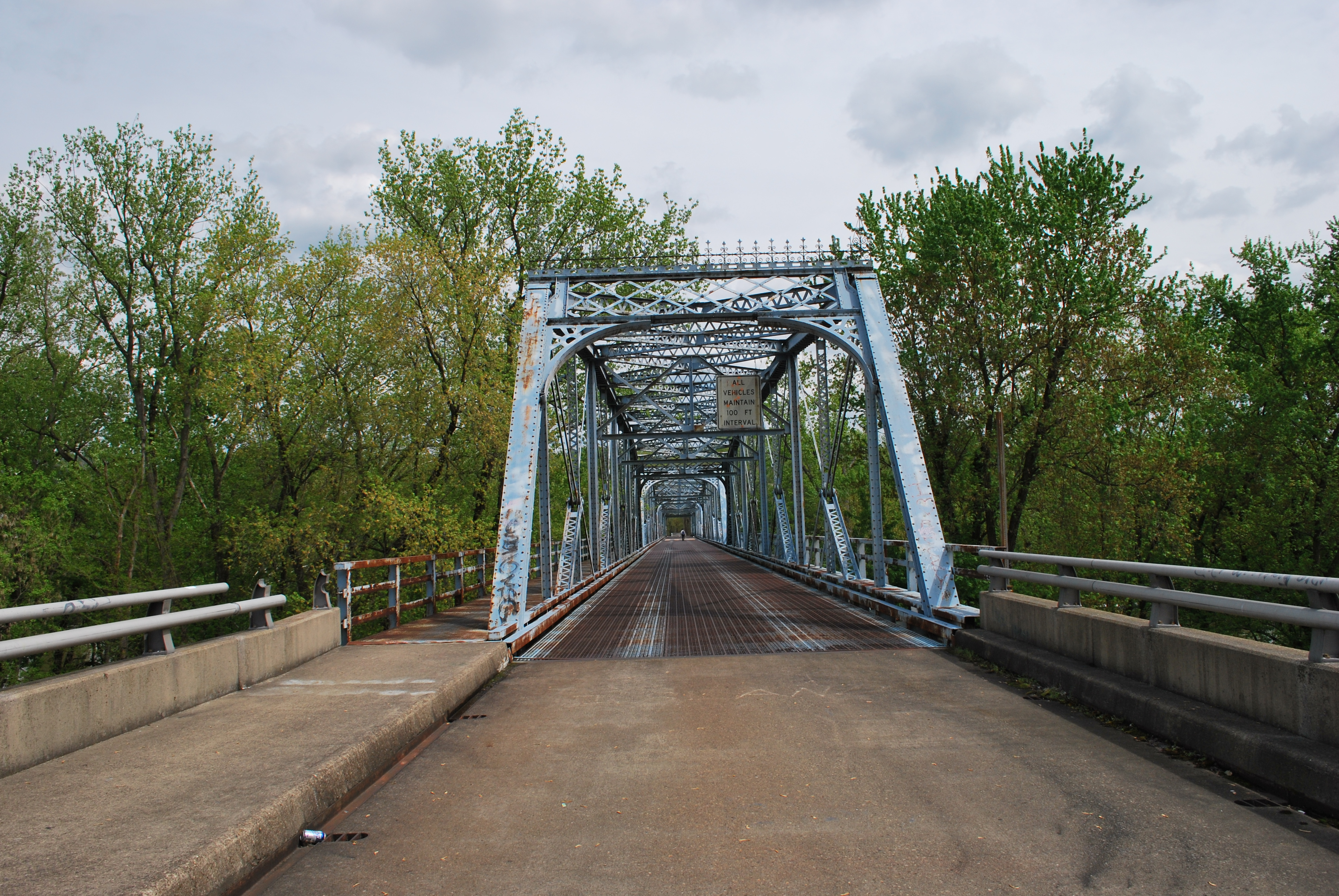
- View of bridge from Ohio end
- Coordinates: 40°04′48″N 80°44′13″W
- Crosses: Back channel of the Ohio River
- Locale: Wheeling, West Virginia

Characteristics
- Design: Pin-connected Pennsylvania through truss; Parker truss configuration
- Material: Steel
- Total length: 440 feet (130 m)
- Longest span: 110 feet (34 m)
- No. of spans: 4 spans

History
- Designer: Wrought Iron Bridge Company of Canton, Ohio
- Construction start: 1890
- Construction end: 1891
- Closed: 1988

Statistics
- Daily traffic: pedestrian only
- Aetnaville Bridge
- U.S. Historic district – Contributing property
- Location within West Virginia Location within the United States
- Coordinates: 40°4′48.118″N 80°44′12.5118″W
- Part of: Wheeling Island Historic District (ID92000320)
- Designated CP: April 2, 1992

Location
- Interactive map of Aetnaville Bridge

The Aetnaville Bridge is a through truss bridge spanning the back channel of the Ohio River between Bridgeport, Ohio and Wheeling, West Virginia. The bridge was built in December 1891 and used for vehicular traffic until December 1988, when it was closed to cars due to safety concerns. The structure was used by pedestrians until its complete closure in 2016.

During the late 1800s and early 1900s, the bridge was used for streetcars until service ceased in 1948. The bridge is now used mostly as a way for pedestrians, bicyclists, and joggers, to cross without having to go all the way around to the new Bridgeport Bridge. The bridge was closed from October 19 to 23, 2015, to be evaluated for safety. Local residents are fighting to save this bridge, because it is a popular pedestrian footwalk, and part of a proposed bicycle and jogging trail. As of January 20, 2016, there have been metal fences barricading the bridge pending further decision-making as to how to proceed with possible repairs .

== See also ==
- List of crossings of the Ohio River

Browse numbered routes
← WV 251	list	→ WV 259
