= Belleview Heights =

- U.S. National Register of Historic Places
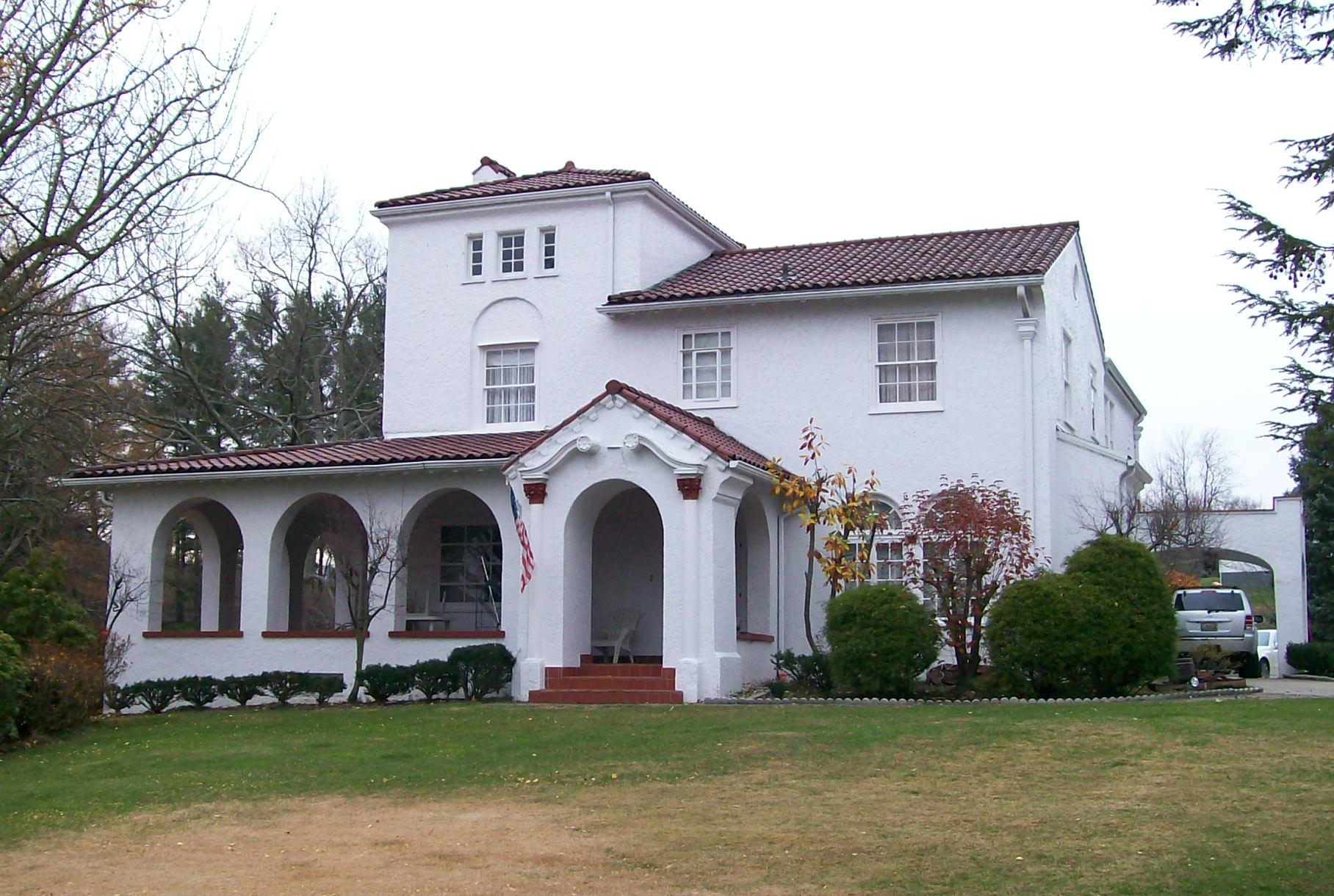
- Front facade of Belleview Heights

- Location within Ohio Location within the United States
- Location: 65100 Candlewick Ln., Bellaire, Ohio
- Coordinates: 40°1′41″N 80°44′37″W
- Area: 2 acres (0.81 ha)
- Built: 1928
- Architect: Franzheim, Edward Bates; Keyser, C. D.
- Architectural style: Mission/Spanish Revival
- NRHP reference No.: 94000259
- Added to NRHP: April 08, 1994

Belleview Heights, also known as the Rigas House, is located at 61500 Candlewick Lane in Bellaire, Ohio. The house and gardens were placed on the National Register on 1994-04-08.

The mansion once housed Bob Hope during 1951, and was also the site of the premiere of My Favorite Spy.
